= Rock formations of Adélie Land =

This is a list of rock formations in the French Antarctic territory of Adélie Land.

== Bizeux Rock ==
Bizeux Rock is a rocky island 0.1 nautical miles (0.2 km) long lying 0.2 kilometres (0.1 nmi) east of Manchot Island and close northeast of Cape Margerie, Antarctica. It was charted in 1950 by the French Antarctic Expedition and named by them after an island located in the center of the Rance estuary, France.

== Débarquement Rock ==
Débarquement Rock is a 200-metre (220 yd) long rock and historic site (HSM 81).

== Janet Rock ==
Janet Rock (66°33′S 139°10′E) is a small rock 7.5 nautical miles (14 km) west-northwest of Liotard Glacier, lying immediately seaward of the ice cliffs overlying the coast of Antarctica. It was photographed from the air by U.S. Navy Operation Highjump, 1946–47, was charted by the French Antarctic Expedition, 1952–53, and named by them for Paul Janet, a French spiritualist-philosopher of the 19th century.

== Mathieu Rock ==
Mathieu Rock (66°20′S 136°49′E) is an ice-free rock, midway between Cape Bickerton and Rock X, at the east side of the entrance to Victor Bay, Antarctica. It was photographed from the air by U.S. Navy Operation Highjump, 1946–47 and charted by the French Antarctic Expedition, 1952–53, under Marret. The rock was named for Mathieu Rivolier, born 29 April 1952, the son of the French doctor of the Antarctic expedition Jean Rivolier.

== Rock X ==
Rock X (66°20′S 136°42′E) is a prominent offshore rock 0.4 miles (0.6 km) long, lying close inside the east side of the entrance to Victor Bay, 1 mile (1.6 km) northwest of Gravenoire Rock on the Antarctic coast. It was photographed from the air by the U.S. Navy during Operation Highjump (1946–47), and charted by the French Antarctic Expedition under Marret, 1952–53. The rock was so named because it was indicated by a cross or "X" mark in selected prints of Operation Highjump photographs. This marking served to identify the feature to the French expedition party, which established an astronomical control station there.

== Tour de Pise ==
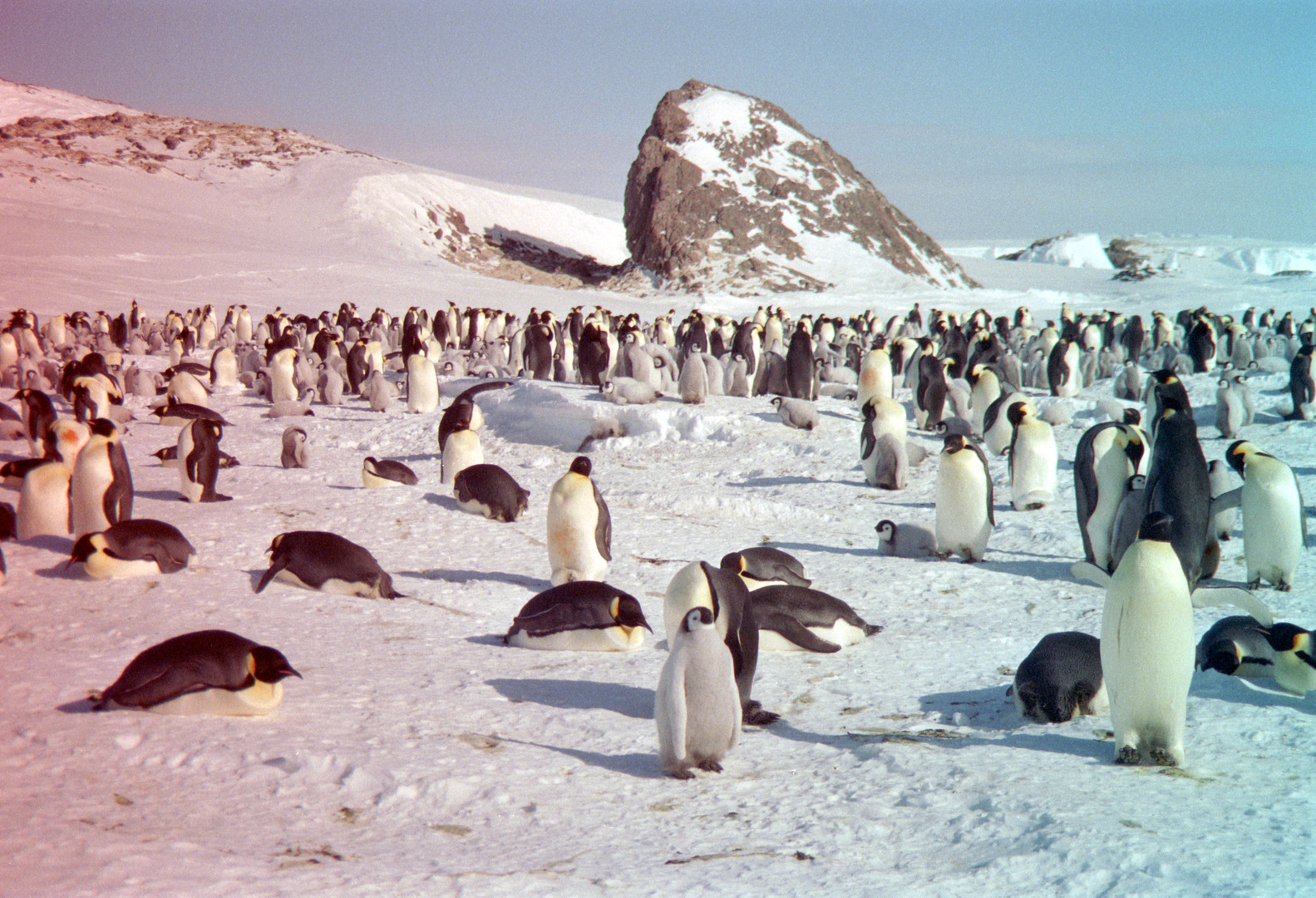
Emperor penguins and chicks with the rock known as Tour de Pise in the background (anaglyphic 3D picture, 3D red cyan glasses are recommended to view this image correctly.)

Tour de Pise (66°40′S 140°1′E) is an isolated rock dome, 27 m, which protrudes through the ice in northwest Rostand Island in the Géologie Archipelago. It was charted in 1951 by the French Antarctic Expedition and named by them for the famous Tower of Pisa.
