= Whetter =

Whetter is a surname. Notable people with this surname include:

- Gary Whetter (born 1963), English footballer
- James Whetter (1935–2018), Cornish historian and politician
- Leslie Whetter (1888–1955), New Zealand surgeon and Antarctic explorer

== Other ==
- Whetter Nunatak, Antarctica, named after Leslie Whetter

== See also ==
- Robert Whetters (born 1939), Australian racing cyclist
