= Bickerton =

Bickerton may refer to:

== Places ==
- Bickerton, Cheshire, village and civil parish in England, United Kingdom
  - Bickerton Hill, Cheshire
- Bickerton, Devon, England, United Kingdom
- Bickerton, North Yorkshire, England, United Kingdom
- Bickerton Island, small island off Australia
- Cape Bickerton, Adélie Land, Antarctica

== People ==
- Bickerton (surname)
- Bickerton baronets, an extinct title in the Baronetage of Great Britain
- Derek Bickerton, linguist

== Other ==
- HMS Bickerton (K466), a British Captain-class frigate of the Second World War
- Bickerton (bicycle), a folding bicycle manufactured in the UK between 1971 and 1991

== See also ==
- Port Bickerton, Nova Scotia, Canada, a small community
