= Manchot Island =

Island in Adélie Land, Antarctica

- Location within Antarctica

Geography
- Location: Antarctica
- Coordinates: 66°49′S 141°24′E

Administration
- Administered under the Antarctic Treaty System

Demographics
- Population: Uninhabited

Manchot Island is a rocky island lying in the entrance to Port Martin, Antarctica. It is 0.4 kilometres (0.2 nmi) west of Bizeux Rock and 0.4 kilometres (0.2 nmi) north of Cape Margerie. The island was photographed from the air by U.S. Navy Operation Highjump, 1946–47, and was charted by the French Antarctic Expedition, 1949–51. It was so named by the French expedition because a large Adélie penguin rookery was located on the island, and "manchot" is a French word for penguin.

== See also ==
- List of Antarctic and sub-Antarctic islands
