= Houle Island =

Island in Adélie Land, Antarctica

- Location within Antarctica

Geography
- Location: Antarctica
- Coordinates: 66°42′S 141°12′E

Administration
- Administered under the Antarctic Treaty System

Demographics
- Population: Uninhabited

Houle Island is a low rocky island 2 kilometres (1 nmi) west of Ressac Island and about 6 kilometres (3.5 nmi) north-northeast of Zelee Glacier Tongue, Antarctica. It was photographed from the air by U.S. Navy Operation Highjump, 1946–47, was charted by the French Antarctic Expedition, 1949–51, and so named by them because the surf breaks over this low-lying island. "Houle" is a French word for surge or swell.

== See also ==
- List of Antarctic and sub-Antarctic islands
