= Ressac Island =

Island in Adélie Land, Antarctica

Ressac Island (66°42′S 141°14′E) is a small rocky island 1 nautical mile (1.9 km) east of Houle Island and 4 nautical miles (7 km) northeast of Zelee Glacier Tongue. Photographed from the air by U.S. Navy Operation Highjump, 1946–47. Charted by the French Antarctic Expedition, 1949–51, and so named by them because the surf breaks over the island. "Ressac" is the French word for surf.

== See also ==
- List of Antarctic and sub-Antarctic islands
