= Ravin =

Ravin may refer to:

- Idan Ravin, basketball coach
- Emilie de Ravin (born 1981), Australian-American actress
- Ravin Bay, bay in Antarctica
- Ravin Jagarnath, Mauritian politician
- A spelling variation of Raven
