= Richard Bickerton =

Richard Bickerton may refer to:

- Sir Richard Bickerton, 1st Baronet (1727–1792), British Royal Navy admiral
- Sir Richard Bickerton, 2nd Baronet (1759–1832), his son, British Royal Navy admiral
- Richard F. Bickerton (1844–1895), British-born judge and politician in Hawaii

== See also ==
- Bickerton (surname)
