= Leslie Whetter =

New Zealand surgeon and Antarctic explorer

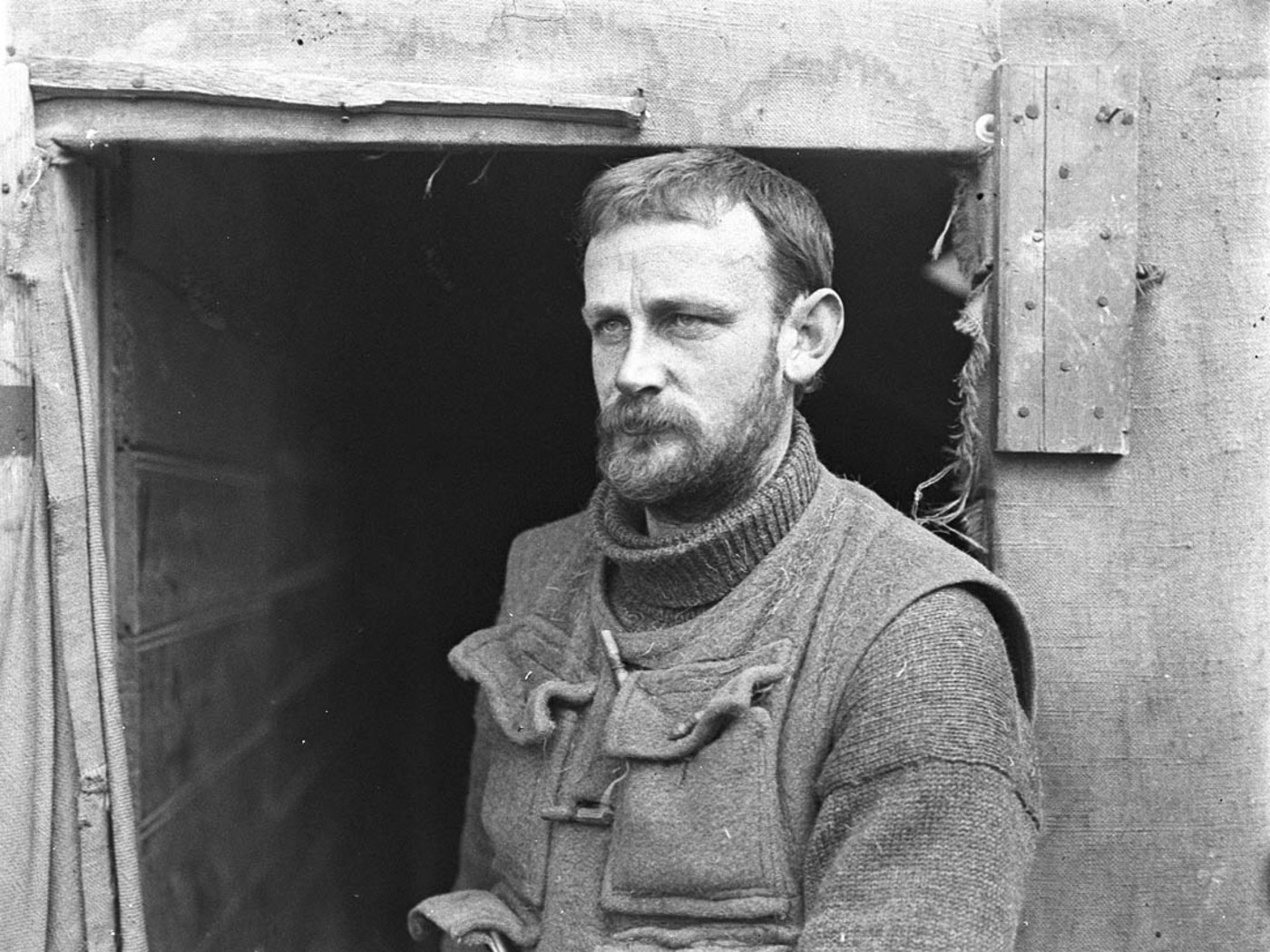
Whetter during the Australasian Antarctic Expedition

Leslie Hatton Whetter (10 December 1888 Dunedin, Otago, New Zealand – 3 December 1955 Matakana, Auckland, New Zealand); was a surgeon and Antarctic explorer from New Zealand. A graduate of the University of Otago, in 1911 he joined the Australasian Antarctic Expedition (AAE), led by Douglas Mawson. During 1912, Whetter joined two sledging parties, the first to lay supplies, and the second to explore the area to the west of the Main Base at Cape Denison. On the second expedition, his party of three man-hauled a sledge 158 miles (254 km) from the Cape Denison base, and in the process discovered the first meteorite to be found in Antarctica. Mawson thought Whetter lazy, and the two clashed several times, Mawson describing Whetter as "not fit for a polar expedition".

== Australasian Antarctic Expedition ==
Prior to the AAE, Whetter studied medicine at the University of Otago. He was originally selected for the AAE as the surgeon on the expedition's third Antarctic base, but Mawson decided to consolidate the three parties into two Whetter joined the Main Base. With Archibald Lang McLean—the surgeon originally chosen for the Main Base—as chief medical officer, Whetter assumed responsibility for ensuring the base was adequately stocked with water. This involved fetching blocks of ice from the head of a nearby glacier, and piling them on the hut's veranda, ready for use. (Note: According to Cecil Madigan, meteorologist at the base, Whetter was given this task "because he was of little use for anything else.") Despite the apparent simplicity of this task, Whetter routinely clashed with Mawson; he told the expedition's leader he had come to Antarctica not to work but to study for exams. On a day when Mawson believed Whetter had been particularly lazy, Mawson wrote in his diary: "Whetter is not fit for a polar expedition ... Of late he has complained of overwork, and he only does an honest 2 hours work per day." Another incident a week later prompted Mawson to tell Whetter "that he was entirely unfit for an expedition, chiefly through lack of determination in character and failing to do his level best."

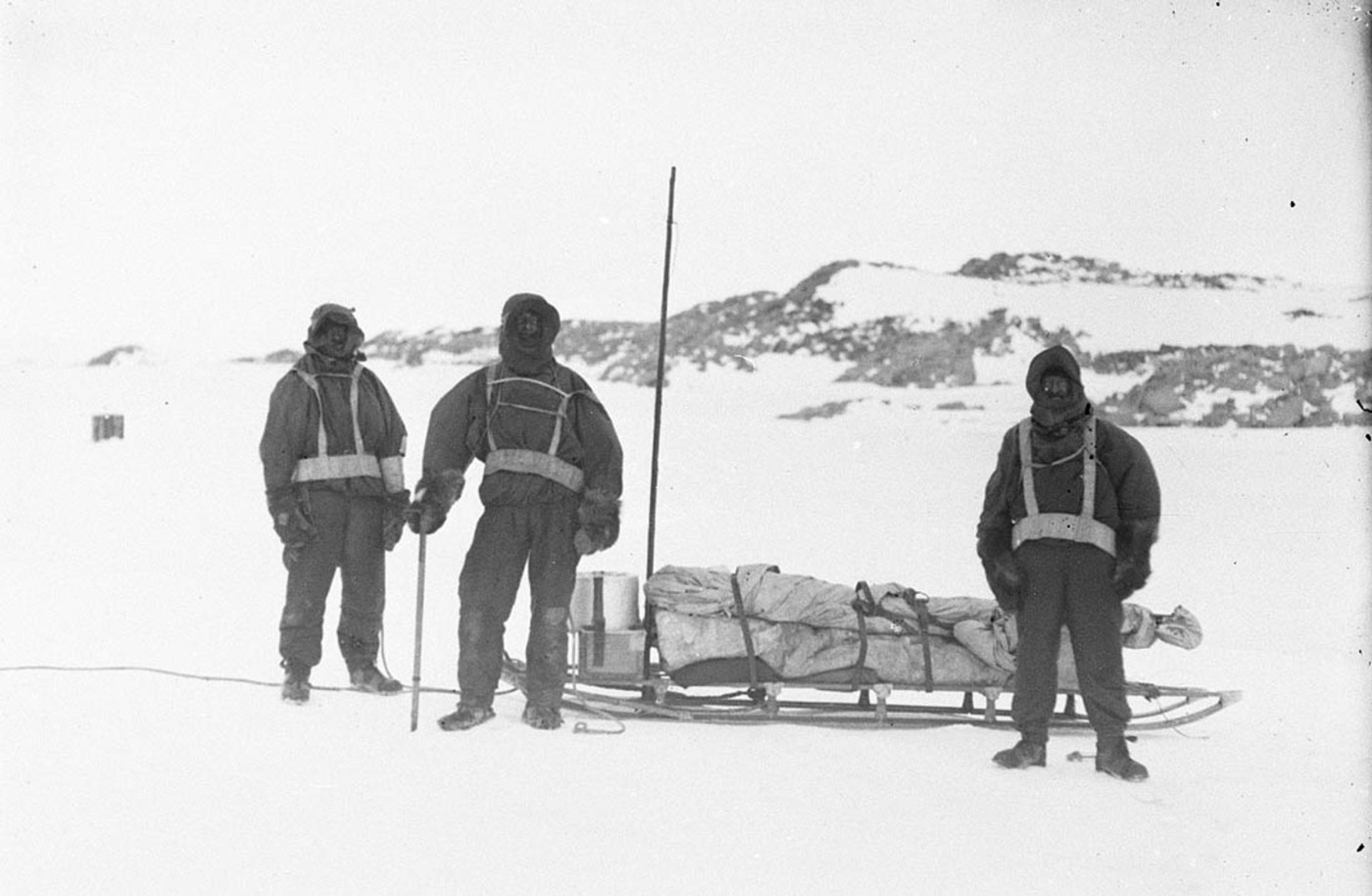
Madigan, Close and Whetter after the western survey party returned to Cape Denison

On 12 September 1912, along with Cecil Madigan and John Close, Whetter set out on a man-hauled sledging expedition to the west of the base to lay a food depot for the summer sledging season. Battling strong winds, crevasses and sastrugi, (Note: Large grooves in the ice caused by continuous wind.) the party spent a week travelling the 50 miles (80 km) to lay the depot. Travelling back to base, their tent was torn apart by the wind, and only a hasty repair-job allowed them to return to base uninjured. Madigan suffered frostbite, Close severe blisters from the 13-mile (21 km)-hike to sanctuary after the destruction of their tent, but Whetter was injured only by Madigan's scissors, which he used to remove Whetter's helmet "when it was so firmly frozen to his face that it was necessary to adopt drastic measures for its removal in order that he could partake of food."

Upon his return to the base, Whetter's supposed laziness continued to put him at odds with Mawson. Eventually Mawson took Whetter to his study to talk it over. According to Mawson's diary, Whetter told him that the leader's insistence on near-constant work had meant several men deliberately worked slowly, to avoid being assigned new tasks. In response, Mawson lowered the work regimen down to six hours a day, and gave the men Sundays off, provided the wind had not let up to the extent that work could be done outside.

=== Western party ===
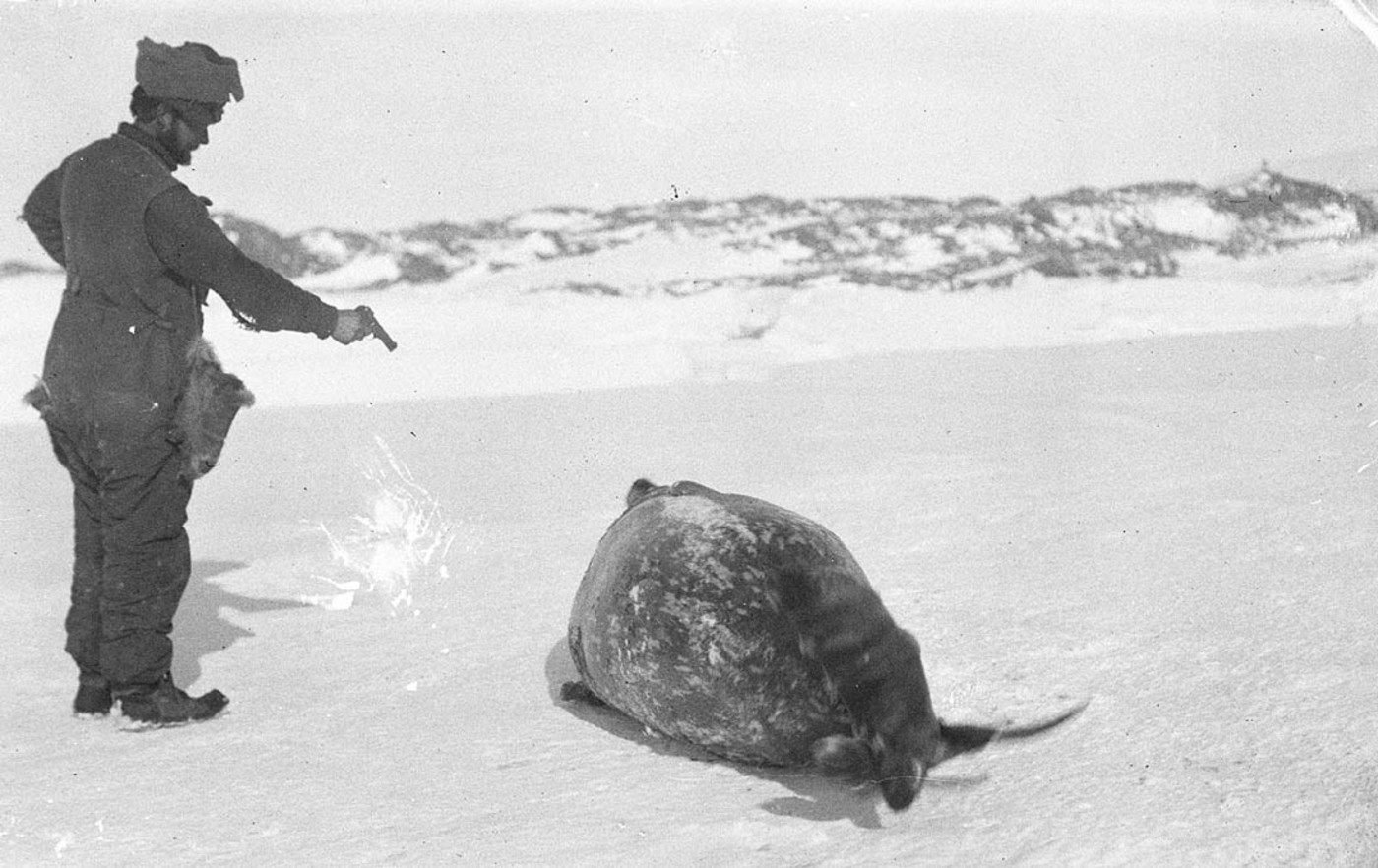
Whetter shoots a Weddell seal

Whetter was chosen to accompany engineer Frank Bickerton and cartographer Alfred Hodgeman on a summer sledging party to explore the area to the west of the hut. This Western party would leave base on 3 December and use the air-tractor sledge—a wingless aeroplane taken on the AAE—haul a train of four sledges. However, the air-tractor broke down after just 10 miles (16 km), and the party continued without it. On the third day, man-hauling one of the sledges, the party discovered the Adélie Land meteorite, the first meteorite to be found in Antarctica.

The same bad weather and sastrugi that had disrupted the spring sledging party continued to cause havoc on the Western party. At times, the wind was so strong that one of the men had to walk behind the sledge, holding taut a line to prevent the sledge swinging broadside. However, it was the sastrugi that damaged the sledge; it hit one ridge so hard the front smashed. The party continued west until 21 December, when a "hurricane" confined them to their tent for four days. Continuing on 26 December, they reached their furthest point from Cape Denison, 158 miles (254 km), and turned back. Noting that the winds abated somewhat late afternoon, the party began marching at night. Even during the day, visibility was so poor that they missed the depot the spring party had left. The party reached Aladdin's Cave (a hollow in the ice in the plateau above Cape Denison used for shelter and storage) on 17 January, and returned to base a day later.

== Later life ==
After the expedition ship SY Aurora returned the majority of men to Australia in early 1913, Whetter headed back to New Zealand.

Whetter served in the New Zealand Medical Corps during the First World War, and married in England in 1919. After the war he took a position as a doctor in Samoa, and from 1923 practised medicine in Makatana, New Zealand. Whetter was recorded as a member of the Royal Society of New Zealand from 1944–45 and died in 1955, aged 67.

The Whetter Nunatak, about 15 kilometres (9.3 mi) to the north-east of Cape Denison, was named for him by Mawson.
