= Adèle Dumont d'Urville =

Wife of French explorer Jules Dumont d'Urville (1798–1842)

- Born: Adèle Dorothée Pépin; 1798
- Died: 8 May 1842 (aged 43–44); Meudon
- Known for: Wife of French explorer Jules Dumont d'Urville

Adèle Dorothée Dumont d'Urville (French pronunciation: [adɛl dɔʁɔte dymɔ̃ dyʁvil]; née Pépin, also spelled as Adélie, 1798 – 8 May 1842) was the wife of French explorer Jules Dumont d'Urville. Adélie Land, Adele Island, Adélie penguin and Cape Pepin are named after her. While Adélie Land, Adele Island and Cape Pepin were named by Jules Dumont d'Urville in honor of his wife, the penguin was named after Adélie Land where it was discovered. In 1981, an airmail postage stamp of the French Antarctic Territory featuring Adèle Dumont d'Urville was released.

== Life ==
Adèle Dumont d'Urville was born in the family of watchmaker Joseph Marie Pépin. She met her future husband in Pépin's shop, which Dumont d'Urville visited several times. She married Dumont d'Urville on 1 May 1815 in Toulon. The ceremony was quiet, with a few guests from both sides. They had at least four children from the marriage, but none survived to adulthood. Adèle later bought a bastide with a garden outside Toulon. She died with her husband and son Jules in a derailment at Meudon. They are buried at Montparnasse Cemetery. The French National Archives contain letters of Adèle Dumont d'Urville.
