= Cape Robert =

Cape Robert (66°23′S 137°39′E) is an ice-covered point at the west side of Marret Glacier. It was discovered and named by the French expedition under Captain Jules Dumont d'Urville in 1840. The name Robert is the first name of a member of the family of Dumont d'Urville. The point was roughly charted by the Australasian Antarctic Expedition under Mawson, 1911–14, and more recently delineated from air photos taken by U.S. Navy Operation Highjump, 1946–47.
