= Cape Bickerton =

Cape Bickerton (66°20′S 136°56′E) is an ice-covered point 5 nautical miles (9 km) east-northeast of Gravenoire Rock which marks the north extremity of the coastal area close east of Victor Bay. Charted by the Australasian Antarctic Expedition under Mawson, 1911–1914, and named by him for F. H. Bickerton, engineer of the expedition and leader of the Western Party which sighted the cape from its furthest west camp.
