= Bleue Cove =

Bleue Cove (66°49′S 141°24′E) is a cove lying immediately east of Cape Margerie. It was charted and named in 1950 by the French Antarctic Expedition; the name is descriptive of the color of the water, after the French word for "blue".
