= Cézembre =

Island in Ille-et-Vilaine, France

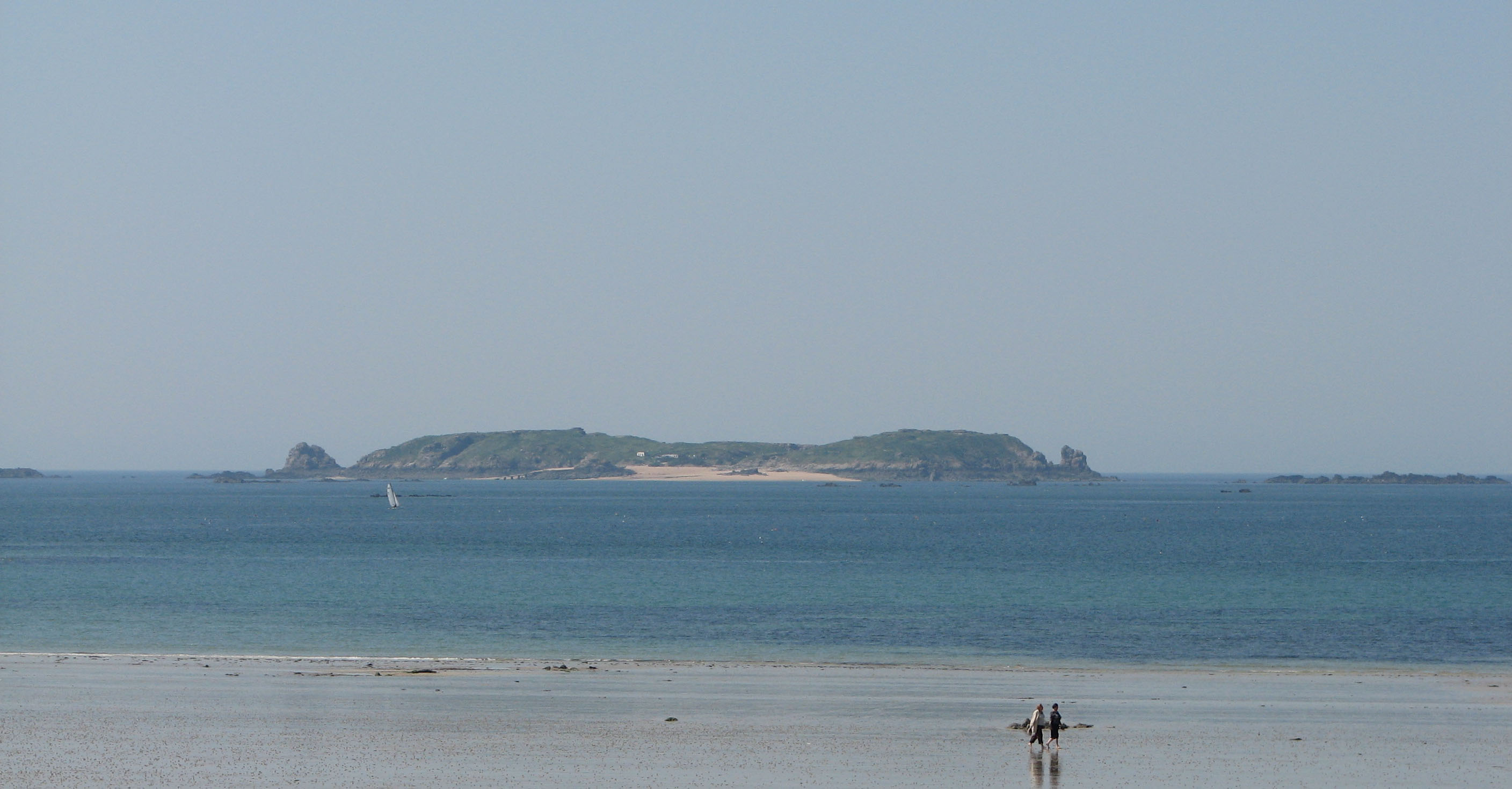
- Cézembre, seen from the Sillon beach, Saint-Malo
- Interactive map of Cézembre

Geography
- Location: Brittany, Ille-et-Vilaine, France
- Coordinates: 48°40′36″N 2°4′17″W

Administration
- France
- Département: Ille-et-Vilaine
- Near: Saint-Malo

Demographics
- Population: Uninhabited

Cézembre is an island in Brittany, in the Ille-et-Vilaine département of France, near Saint-Malo. The island is uninhabited, with a surface area of approximately 18 hectares (44 acres), a length of 750 metres (2,461 ft), and a maximum width of 250 metres (820 ft).

The island features a fine sandy beach facing Saint-Malo on the south, and a steep and rocky coast around the rest of the island. As elsewhere in northern Brittany, the tidal range is among the highest in the world. Until the seventeenth century, the island could be reached on foot at low tide from Saint Malo.

The island's beach is popular in summer with visitors arriving by yacht or motorboat and there are also regular shuttles from St-Malo, although landing is only possible at high tide. A small restaurant serves lunches and prebooking is essential.

Cézembre was inhabited by a number of hermits over the centuries, and featured a monastery for a time. There were also five small chapels. The chapel dedicated to Saint Brendan was built in 1420 by a hermit priest from Saint-Malo, Raoul Boisserel. Vauban fortified the island at the end of the seventeenth century, and it was used thereafter as a place of quarantine, with cargo stored in Saint Brendan's chapel. During World War I, the Belgian Army installed a disciplinary company on Cézembre. Prior to its destruction during World War II, Saint Brendan's Oratory was a place of pilgrimage for unmarried women who would prick the nose of a wooden statue of the saint with a pin in the hope of a good marriage.

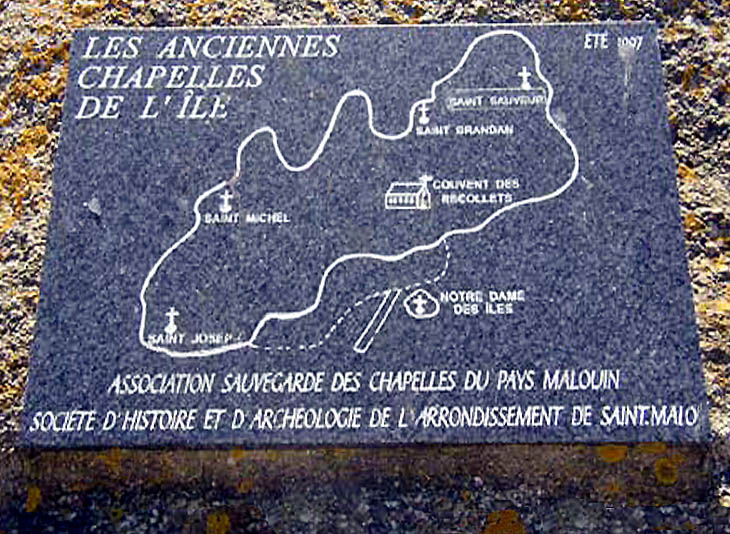
Plaque denoting historic chapels on Cézembre

== World War II ==
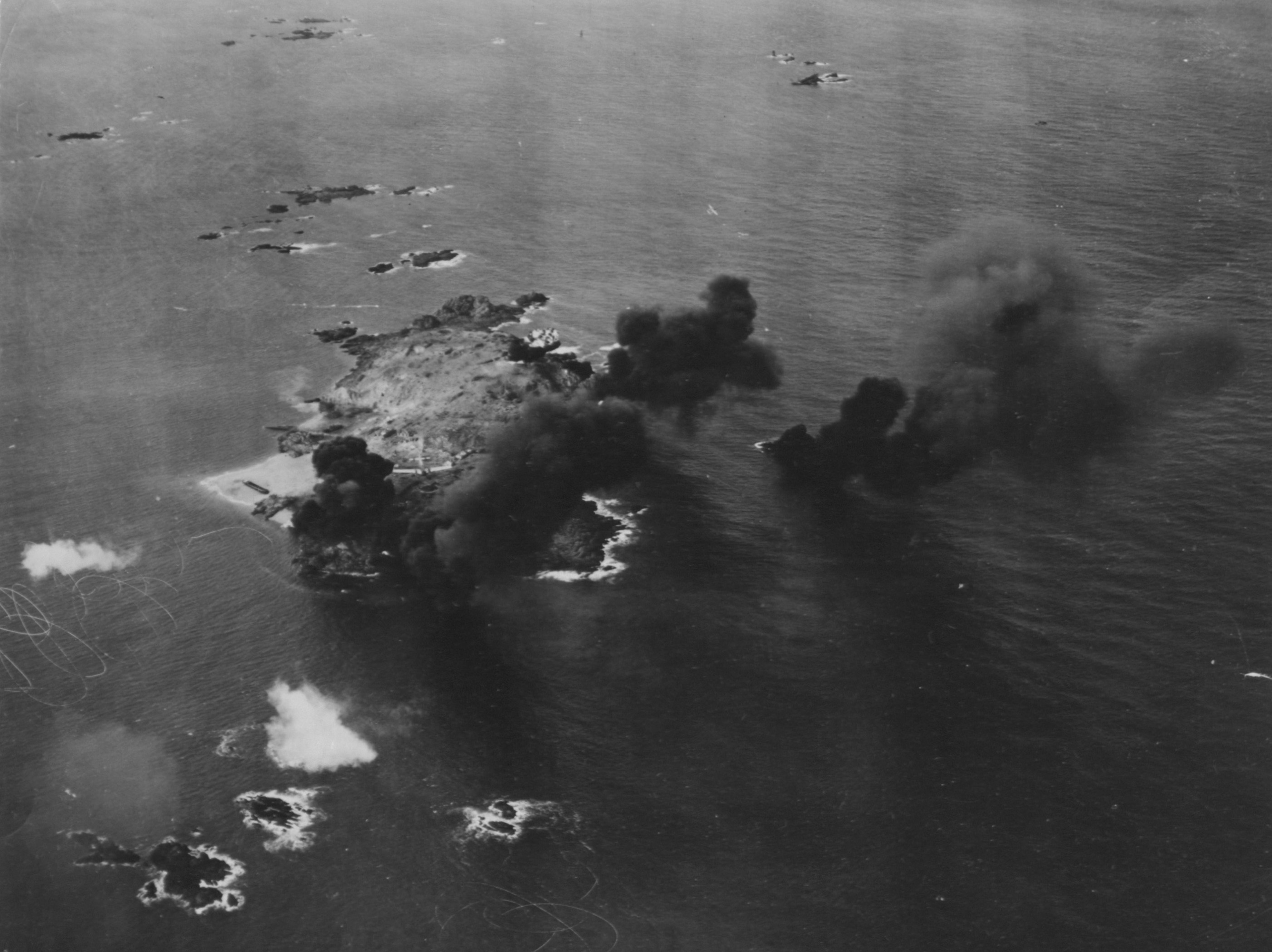
A USAAF aircraft flying over Cézembre shortly after an air attack in August or September 1944

During World War II, the Germans and Italians strengthened the island's fortifications as part of the Atlantic Wall. The Italian contingent was made up of two officers and just over one hundred sailors, included in the 1st Atlantic Naval Infantry Division of the Italian Social Republic. During the Battle of Saint-Malo in August and September 1944 the German-Italian garrison was heavily bombarded by land artillery, naval artillery, and air strikes, with 19,729 aircraft bombs, including phosphorus and napalm, and about 20,000 artillery shells hitting the island. Guns on the island contributed to the defense of St. Malo. The island's three-hundred-man garrison eventually surrendered to elements of the U.S. 83rd Infantry Division on 2 September 1944.

== Post-war ==
As a result of this intense Allied bombardment, Cézembre's landscape is barren and pitted, although natural vegetation is returning. The island has not yet been completely demined, and for this reason most of the island beyond the beach constitutes a zone interdite (prohibited zone), with a barbed-wire fence and warning notices.

After demining operations, the management of the island was transferred from the French ministry of Defense to the Conservatoire du littoral (coastal conservatory, an official French public operator) in October 2017, in order to further expand its natural protection and manage the historic and archaeology sites left on the island, including the ruins of chapels and burial sites.

== Micronation ==
The unrecognized micronation of Talossa has claimed the island of Cézembre since 1982.

== See also ==
- Cézembre Point
