= Cape Pépin =

Ice point on the coast of Antarctica

Cape Pepin (66°32′S 138°34′E) is an ice-covered cape between Ravin Bay and Barre Glacier in Antarctica. Discovered in 1840 by the French expedition under Captain Jules Dumont d'Urville and named by him for his wife Adele Pepin. The area was charted by the Australasian Antarctic Expedition in 1912–13, and again by the British Australian New Zealand Antarctic Research Expedition (BANZARE) in 1931, both under Mawson. The cape was more recently delineated from aerial photographs taken by U.S. Navy Operation Highjump, 1946–47.
