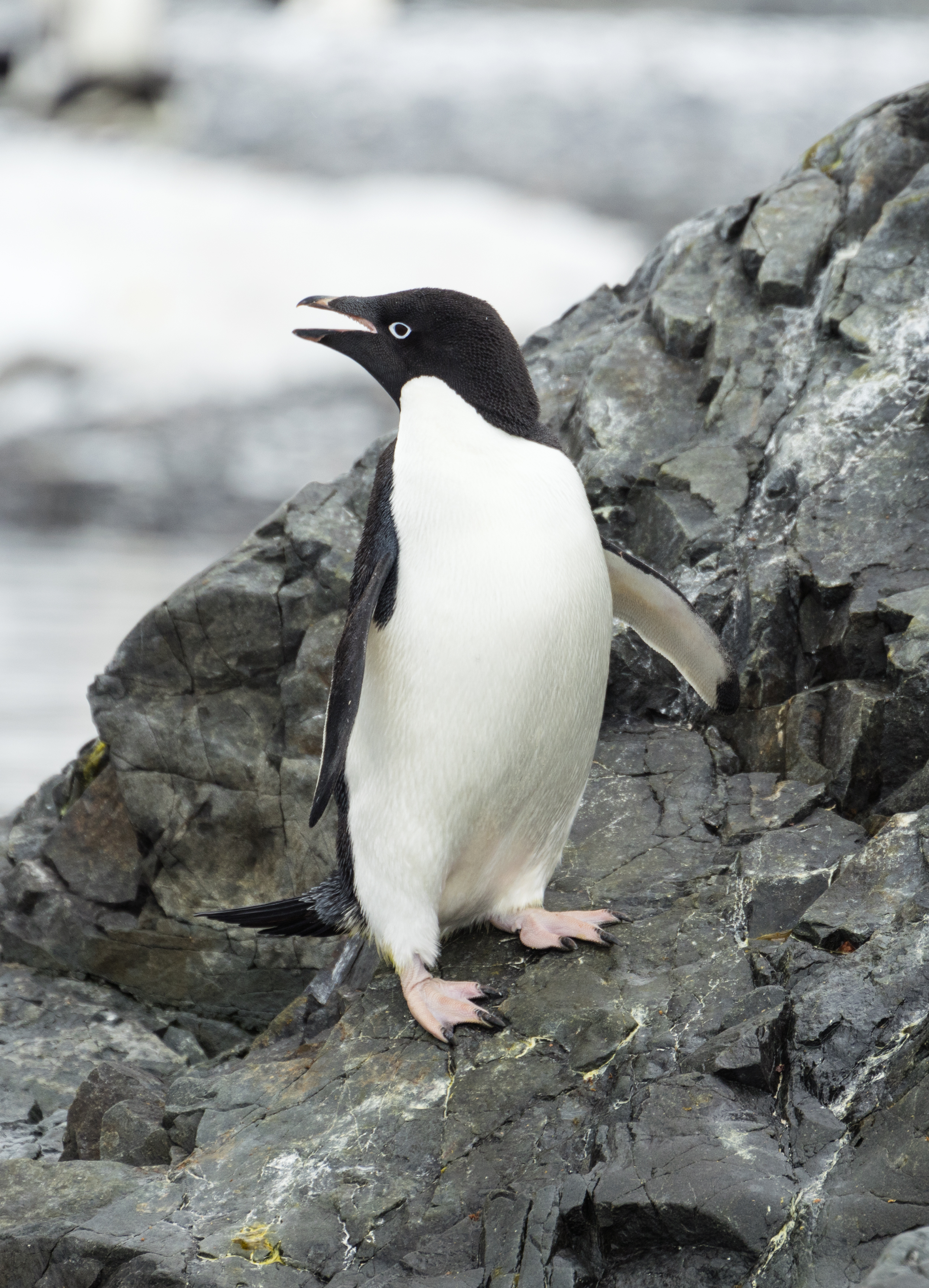
- Hope Bay, Antarctica

Conservation status
- Least Concern (IUCN 3.1)

Scientific classification
- Kingdom: Animalia
- Phylum: Chordata
- Class: Aves
- Order: Sphenisciformes
- Family: Spheniscidae
- Genus: Pygoscelis
- Species: P. adeliae

Binomial name
- Pygoscelis adeliae (Hombron & Jacquinot, 1841)
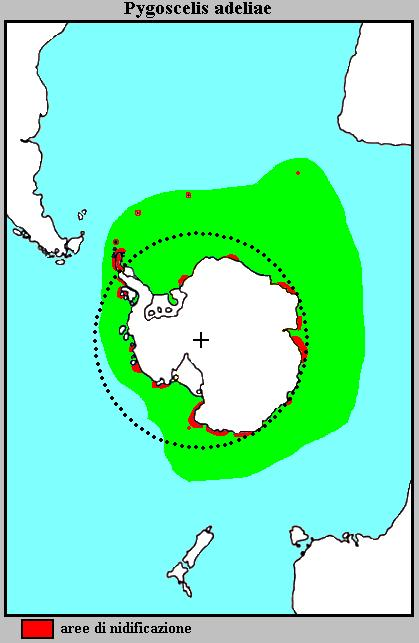
- Distribution of the Adélie penguin Nesting sites in red

Synonyms
- Catarrhactes adeliæ; Eudyptes adeliae; Pygoscelis brevirostris

= Adélie penguin =

Adélie penguin Temporal range: Miocene to recent

Species of bird

The Adélie penguin (Pygoscelis adeliae) is a species of penguin common along the entire coast of the Antarctic continent. It is the most widespread penguin species in the Antarctic, and, along with the emperor penguin, is the most southerly distributed of all penguins. It is named after Adélie Land, in turn, named for Adèle Dumont d'Urville, who was married to French explorer Jules Dumont d'Urville, who first discovered this penguin in 1840. Adélie penguins obtain their food by both predation and foraging, with a diet of mainly krill and fish.

== Taxonomy and systematics ==
The first Adélie penguin specimens were collected by crew members of French explorer Jules Dumont d'Urville on his expedition to Antarctica in the late 1830s and early 1840s. Jacques Bernard Hombron and Honoré Jacquinot, two French surgeons who doubled as naturalists on the journey, described the bird for science in 1841, giving it the scientific name Catarrhactes adeliæ. They used specimens collected from an area of the continent which had been named "terre Adélie", French for Adélie Land, itself named for Dumont d'Urville's wife, Adèle. The bird was later placed in several other genera, including Eudyptes, Pygoscelis and the now-defunct genus Dasyrhamphus, and was also later inadvertently redescribed as Pygoscelis brevirostris.

The Adélie penguin is one of three species now assigned to the genus Pygoscelis. DNA evidence suggests the Pygoscelis lineage diverged from that of other penguin species some 38 million years ago, roughly 2 million years after the ancestors of the genus Aptenodytes diverged. Adélie penguins evolved about 19 million years ago, branching from the ancestor of the other two members of the genus (chinstrap and gentoo penguins), both of which evolved some 5 million years later.

Although it has no identifiable subspecies, the Adélie penguin has two distinct genetic lineages: one found primarily in the Ross Sea, and the other widespread throughout the Antarctic.

=== Etymology ===
The genus name Pygoscelis is a compound word, composed of the Ancient Greek words pugē, meaning "rump", and skelos, meaning "leg". The members of this genus are often called "brush-tailed penguins", a reference to their long, stiff tail feathers. The birds regularly use their tails for support, and the stiff feathers sweep the ground as the penguins walk. The specific name adeliae indicates the location from which the type specimen was collected.

== Distribution and habitat ==
The Adélie penguin is one of only four penguin species to nest on the continent itself. Breeding colonies are scattered along Antarctica's coasts and on a number of sub-Antarctic islands, including those in the South Orkneys, the South Shetlands, the South Sandwich Islands, the Balleny Islands, Scott Island and South Georgia. The penguins are much less common north of the 60th parallel south but have occurred as vagrants in Australia, New Zealand and southern South America.

During the breeding season, they need bare, rocky ground on which to build their nests. They will not nest on ice, and preferentially choose areas where wind or the angle of the sun (or both) helps to keep snow drifts from accumulating. At the start of the breeding seasons, colony sites may be up to 100 km (62 mi) from open water, though the distance decreases as summer progresses and the pack ice breaks up. Once they have finished breeding, adult Adélie penguins typically move to ice floes or ice shelves to moult, though some remain onshore.

During the winter, the birds remain in the pack ice zone, with most moving north to reach areas where there is visible light for at least part of the day – thus north of roughly 73°S. While some remain near their breeding colonies, others may move hundreds or thousands of kilometres away. As long as there are breaks in the pack ice, they can survive hundreds of kilometres south of open water, and birds are known to forage in winter in areas with up to 80% pack ice cover.

== Description ==
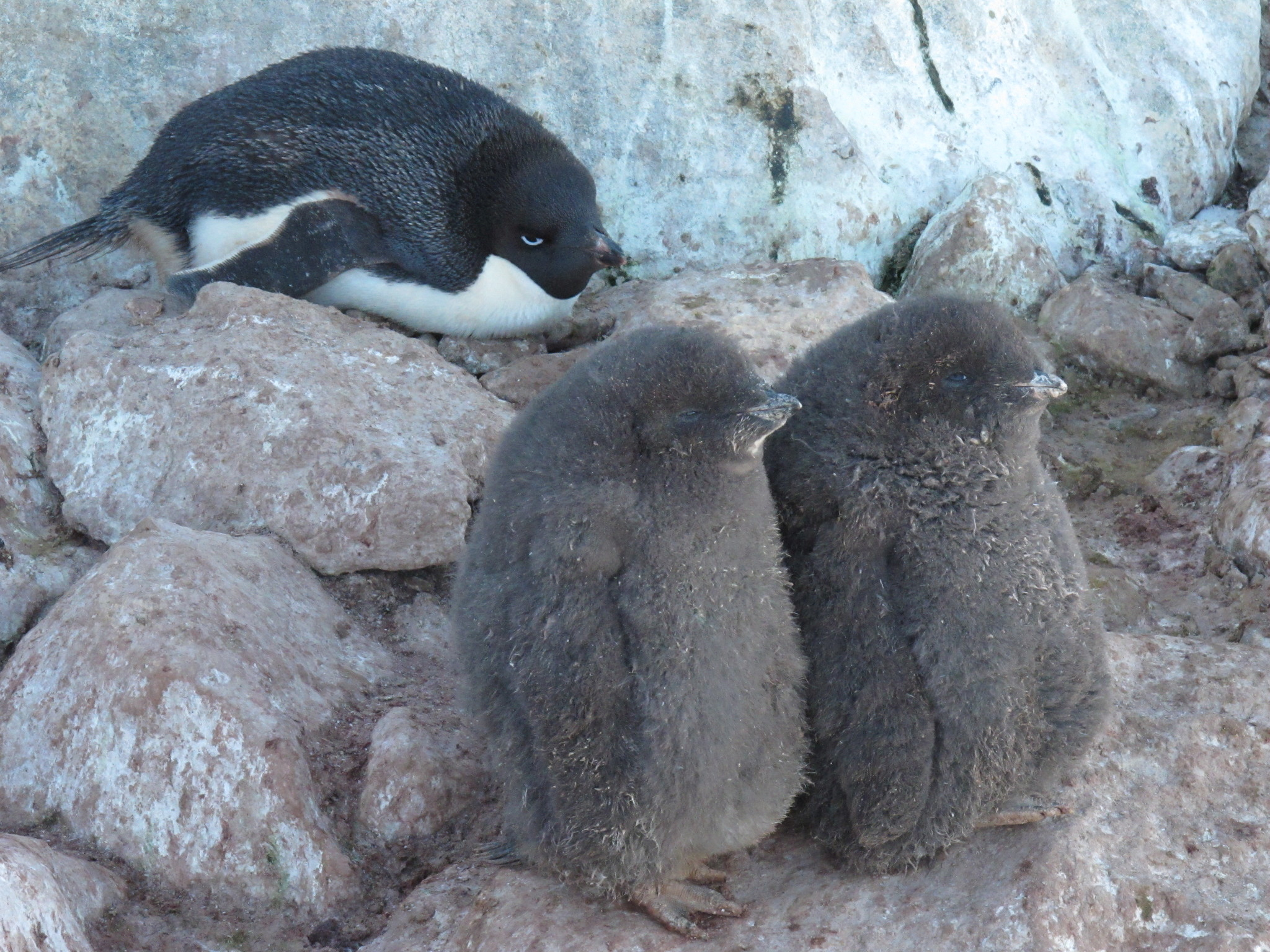
Adult with chicks

The Adélie penguin is a mid-sized bird, measuring 70–73 cm (28–29 in) in length and weighing 3.8 to 8.2 kg (8.4 to 18.1 lb). Although the sexes look the same, females have shorter wings and beaks and weigh significantly less. The adult is black on the head, throat and upper parts, with snowy white underparts. It has a conspicuous white eye ring around a black iris. The beak is largely covered with black feathers, leaving only the tip exposed; this is primarily black, though it can show indistinct reddish-brown markings. The upper surface of the wing is black with a white trailing edge, while the underside is white with a narrow black leading edge and a small black tip. The legs and feet, which are mostly unfeathered, are pinkish.

Upon hatching, the chick is fully covered in down feathers. This coat of feathers is typically silvery-grey (darker on the head), though some birds are much darker overall. Within 10 days, the chick moults into another set of down feathers, this time all dark smoky-grey. Once they have moulted a third time, 7–9 weeks after hatching, the immature birds are similar to adults in appearance, though they tend to be smaller with a bluer tinge to their upperparts and white (rather than black) chins and throats. They lack the full white eye ring of the adult until they are at least a year old.

=== Similar species ===
The adult Adélie penguin is unlikely to be confused with any other species, but the white-throated immature bird can resemble the chinstrap penguin. However, the black on its face extends below its eyes, and it lacks a black line under the throat (the "chinstrap") that the chinstrap penguin has. In addition, the bill of the chinstrap penguin is longer, and lacks the feathering that covers most of the bill of the Adélie penguin. Along with the chinstrap penguins, gentoo penguins are fairly similar to the Adélie due to their Antarctic habitat, as well as their mainly krill and fish centered diet.

== Behaviour and ecology ==
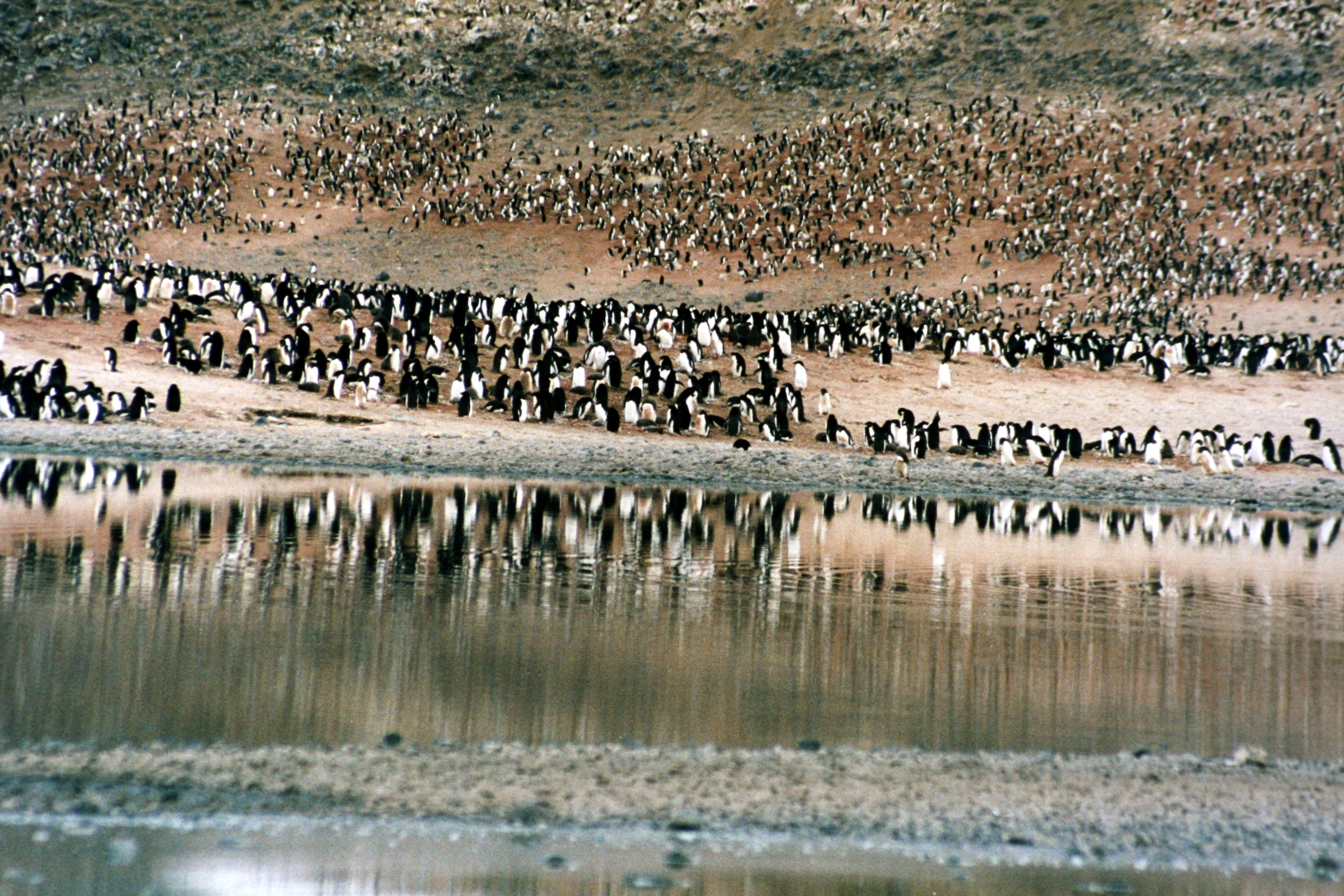
Cape Adare

In Antarctica

Apsley Cherry-Garrard, a survivor of Robert Falcon Scott's ill-fated British Antarctic Expedition of 1910, documented details of penguin behaviour in his book The Worst Journey in the World. "They are extraordinarily like children, these little people of the Antarctic world, either like children or like old men, full of their own importance..." George Murray Levick, a Royal Navy surgeon-lieutenant and scientist who also accompanied Scott, commented on displays of selfishness among the penguins during his surveying in the Antarctic: "At the place where they most often went in [the water], a long terrace of ice about six feet in height ran for some hundreds of yards along the edge of the water, and here, just as on the sea-ice, crowds would stand near the brink. When they had succeeded in pushing one of their number over, all would crane their necks over the edge, and when they saw the pioneer safe in the water, the rest followed." Levick also detailed the mating habits of Adélie penguins.

One writer observed how the penguin's curiosity could also endanger them, which Scott found a particular nuisance:

The great trouble with [the dog teams] has been due to the fatuous conduct of the penguins. Groups of these have been constantly leaping onto our [ice] floe. From the moment of landing on their feet their whole attitude expressed devouring curiosity and a pig-headed disregard for their own safety. They waddle forward, poking their heads to and fro in their usually absurd way, in spite of a string of howling dogs straining to get at them. "Hulloa!" they seem to say, "here's a game – what do all you ridiculous things want?" And they come a few steps nearer. The dogs make a rush as far as their harness or leashes allow. The penguins are not daunted in the least, but their ruffs go up and they squawk with semblance of anger. ... Then the final fatal steps forward are taken and they come within reach. There is a spring, a squawk, a horrid red patch on the snow, and the incident is closed.

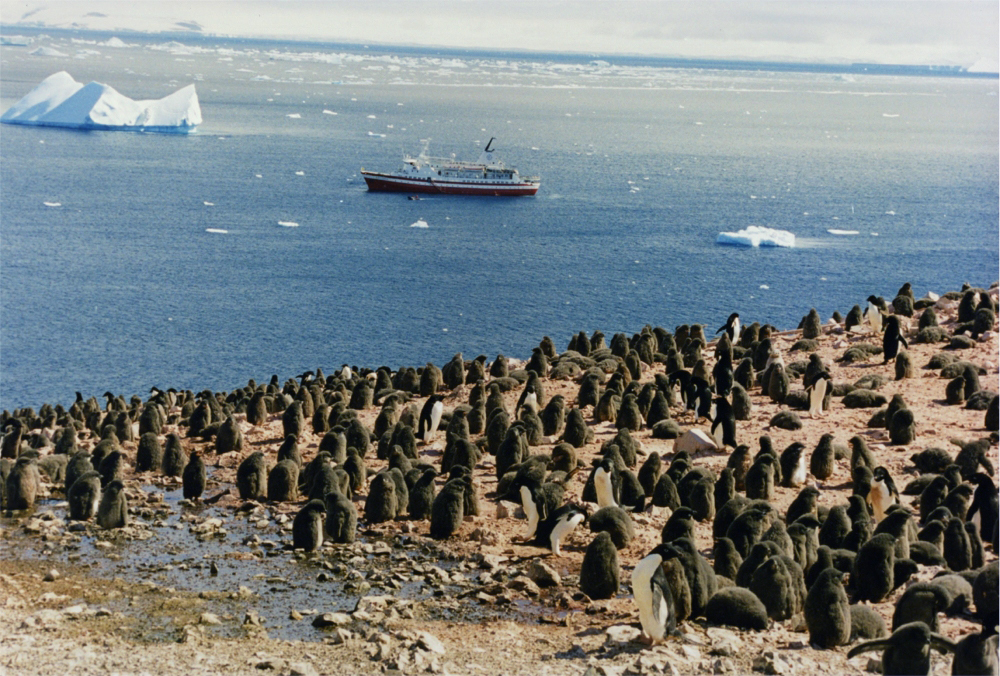
Chicks in Antarctica, with MS Explorer

Others on the mission to the South Pole were more receptive to this element of the Adélies' curiosity. Cherry-Garrard writes:

Meares and Dimitri exercised the dog-teams out upon the larger floes when we were held up for any length of time. One day, a team was tethered by the side of the ship, and a penguin sighted them and hurried from afar off. The dogs became frantic with excitement as he neared them: he supposed it was a greeting, and the louder they barked and the more they strained at their ropes, the faster he bustled to meet them. He was extremely angry with a man who went and saved him from a very sudden end, clinging to his trousers with his beak, and furiously beating his shins with his flippers. It was not an uncommon sight to see a little Adélie penguin standing within a few inches of the nose of a dog which was almost frantic with desire and passion.

Cherry-Garrard held the birds in great regard. "Whatever a penguin does has individuality, and he lays bare his whole life for all to see. He cannot fly away. And because he is quaint in all that he does, but still more because he is fighting against bigger odds than any other bird, and fighting always with the most gallant pluck, he comes to be considered as something apart from the ordinary bird..."

Despite their size, Adélie penguins are known for their bold and boisterous personality and will challenge other animals, including predators far larger than them. In footage shot for the 2018 BBC Earth documentary Spy in the Snow, the boisterous behaviour of Adélie penguins was made especially apparent when an individual arrived to defend a group of emperor penguin chicks that were being menaced by a southern giant petrel (Macronectes giganteus). Despite the species difference between the Adélie and the emperors, the individual charged the petrel, then placed itself between the predator and the chicks until it retreated.

Adélie penguins usually swim at around 5 miles per hour (8.0 km/h). They are able to leap some 3 metres (10 ft) out of the water to land on rocks or ice.

=== Food and feeding ===
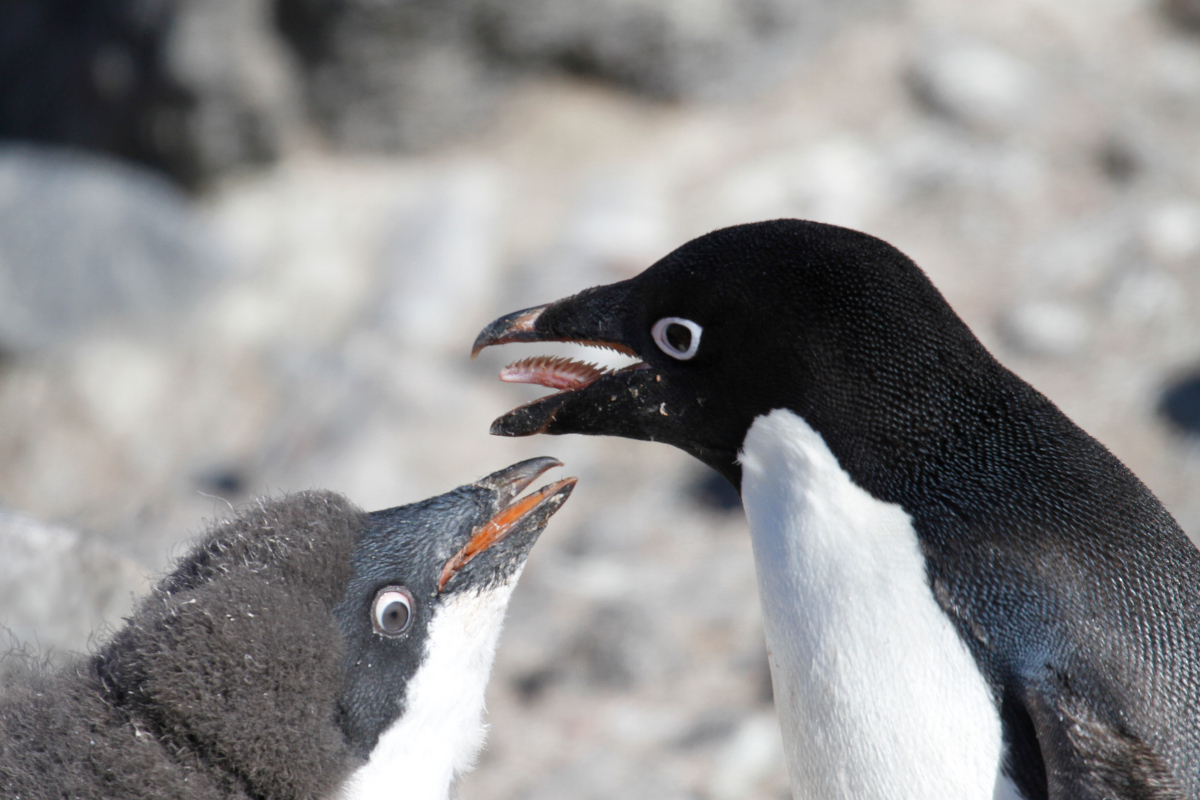
Showing mouth, at Paulet Island

The Adélie penguin is known to feed mainly on Antarctic krill, ice krill, Antarctic silverfish, lanternfish (specifically, the Antarctic lanternfish), amphipods (Themisto gaudichaudii, Cyllopus lucassi, Hyperia and unidentified gammariids), sea krill, glacial squid and other cephalopods (diet varies depending on geographic location) during the chick-rearing season. The stable isotope record of fossil eggshell accumulated in colonies over the last 38,000 years reveals a sudden change from a fish-based diet to krill that began around 200 years ago. This is most likely due to the decline of the Antarctic fur seal since the late 18th century and baleen whales during the early 20th century. The reduction of competition from these predators has resulted in a surplus of krill, which the penguins now exploit as an easier source of food.

Jellyfish including species in the genera Chrysaora and Cyanea were found to be actively sought-out food items, while they previously had been thought to be only accidentally ingested. Similar preferences were found in the little penguin, yellow-eyed penguin and Magellanic penguin.

=== Breeding ===
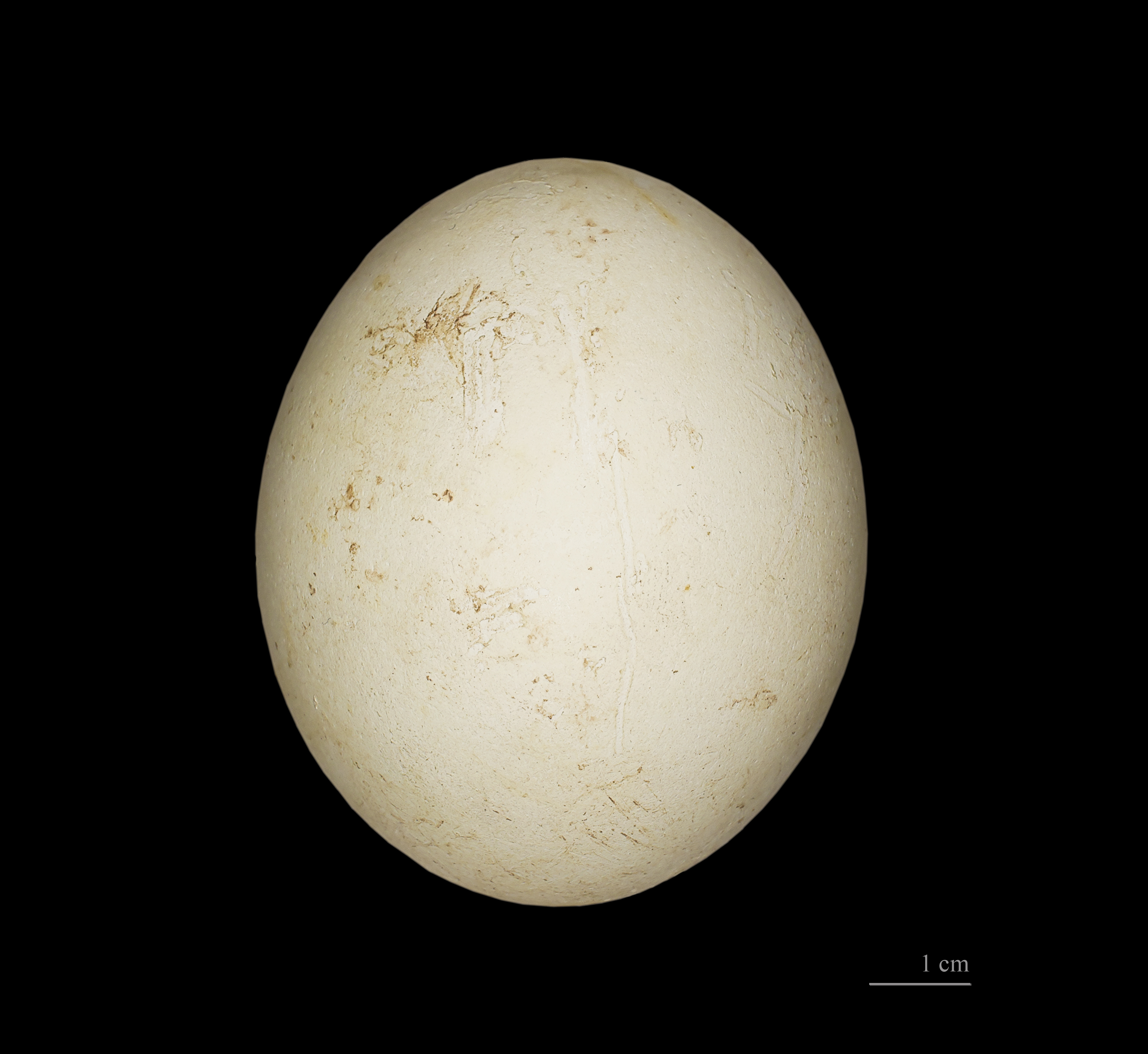
An egg in the Muséum de Toulouse

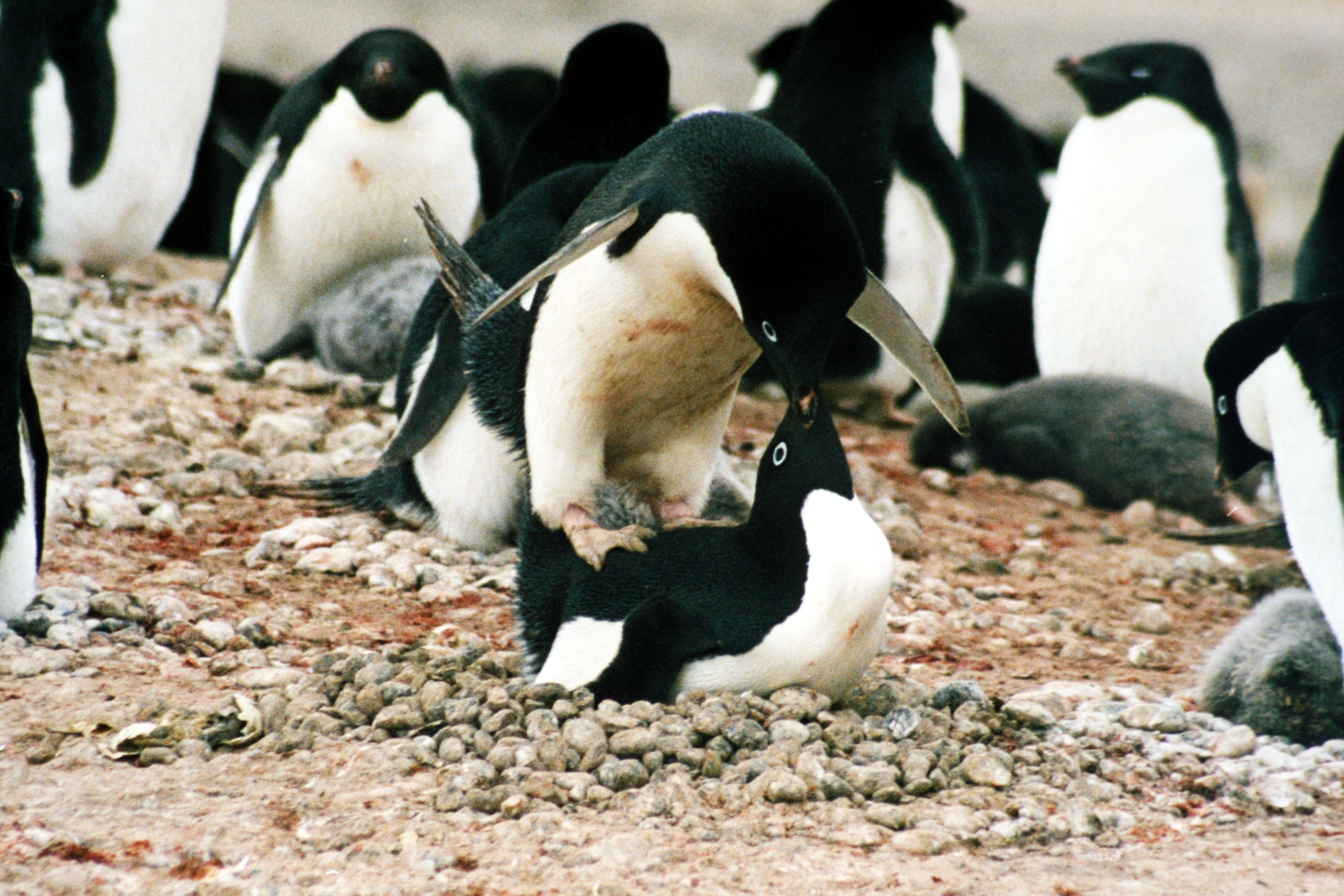
Mating in Antarctica

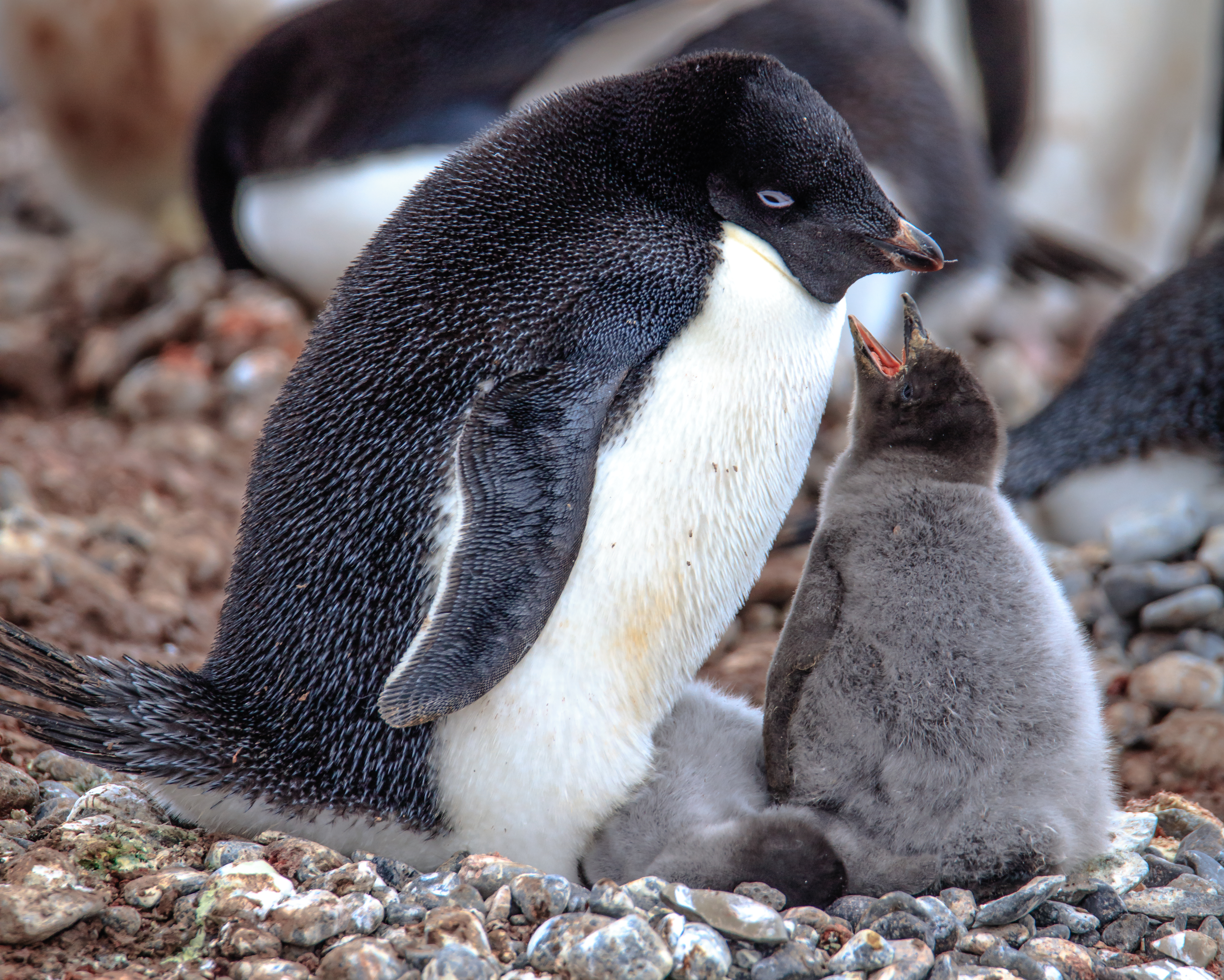
With young chicks

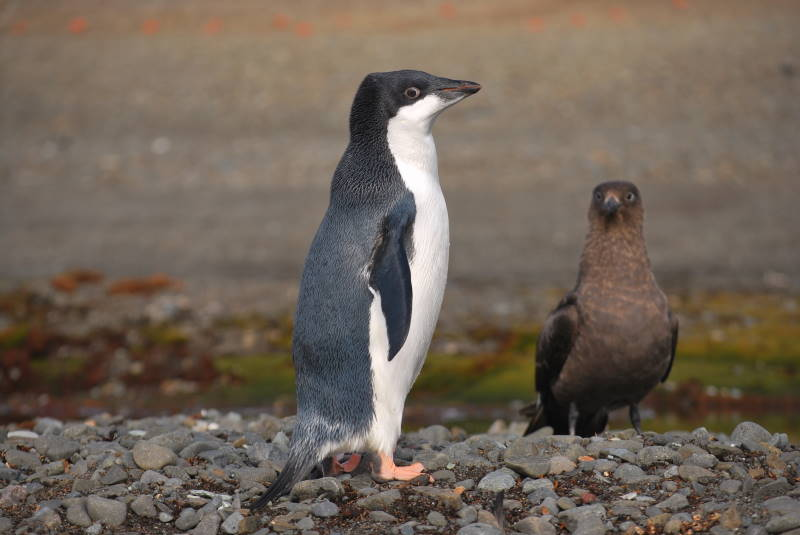
Juvenile, at Greenwich Island

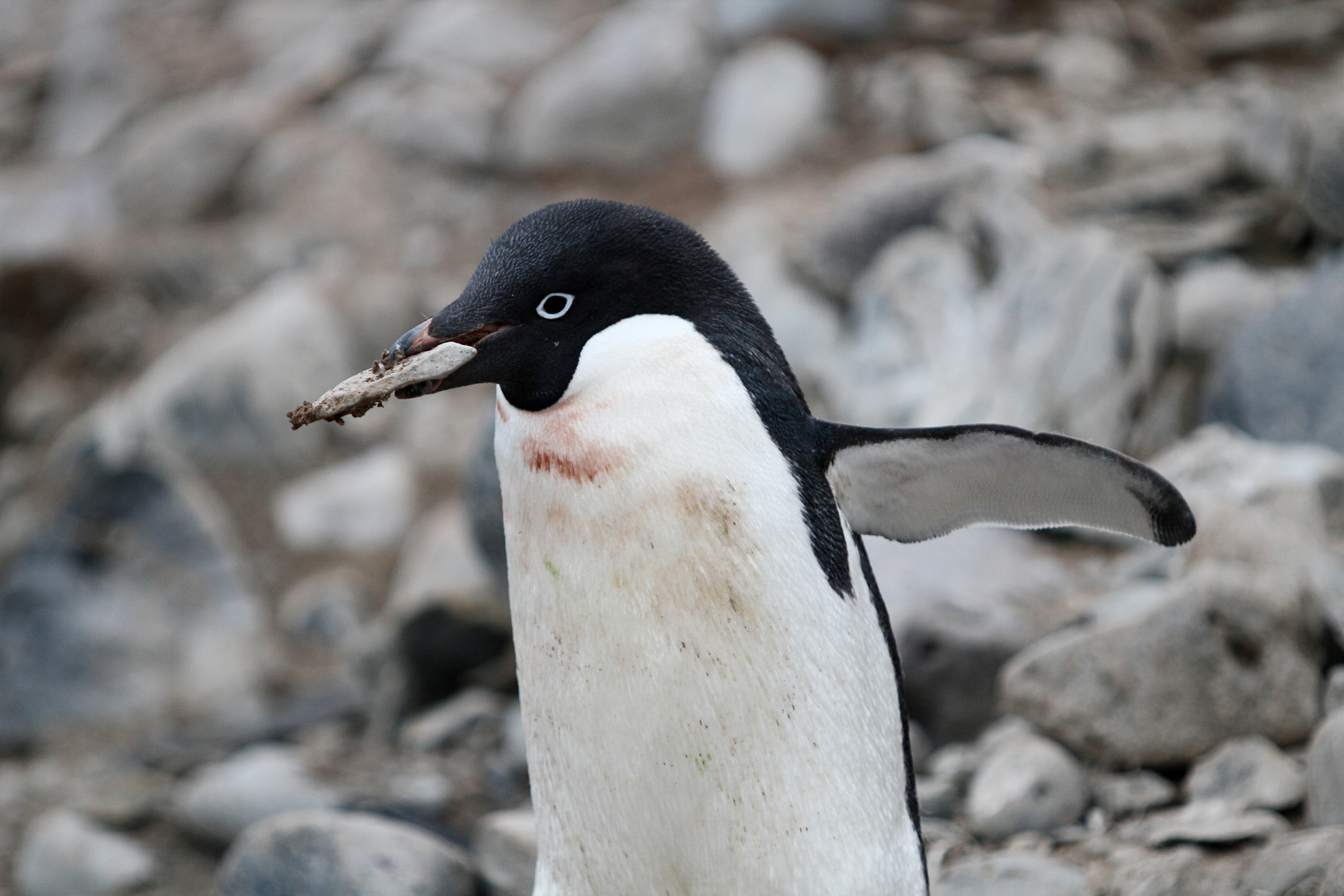
With a rock for nest construction

Adélie penguins breed from October to February. Adélies build rough nests of stones. Two eggs are laid; these are incubated for 32 to 34 days by the parents taking turns (shifts typically last for 12 days). The chicks remain in the nest for 22 days before joining crèches. The chicks moult into their juvenile plumage and go out to sea after 50 to 60 days.

Adélie penguins arrive at their breeding grounds in late October or November, after completing a migration that takes them away from the Antarctic continent for the dark, cold winter months. Their nests consist of stones piled together. In December, the warmest month in Antarctica (ranging from about −19 °C [−2 °F] to −2 °C [28 °F]), the parents take turns incubating the egg; one goes to feed and the other stays to warm the egg. The parent that is incubating does not eat and does not even leave to defecate but instead projects faeces away from the nest. In March, the adults and their young return to the sea. The Adélie penguin lives on sea ice but needs ice-free land to breed. With a reduction in sea ice, populations of the Adélie penguin have dropped by 65% over the past 25 years in the Antarctic Peninsula.

Young Adélie penguins that have no experience in social interaction may react to false cues when the penguins gather to breed. They may, for instance, attempt to mate with other males, with young chicks or with dead females. Levick was the first to record such behaviour (1911–12), but his notes were deemed too indecent for publication at the time; they were rediscovered and published in 2012. (Note: About 100 pamphlets of the notes he took had been circulated to a selected few bearing the bold header Not for Publication. "Levick himself was equally cautious. References to these observations in the notebooks have often been coded by his rewriting certain entries on these behaviours using the Greek alphabet and then pasting this new text over the original entry (Fig. 1), whilst some entries were written directly in the Greek alphabet". The following is an example of such a note; a transcription into the Latin alphabet is given on the right: Θις ἀφτερνooν ἰ σαυ ἀ μoστ εχτραoρδιναρι σιtε. ἀ πενγυιν ὐας ἀκτυαλλι ενyαyεδ ἰν σoδoμι ᾿uπoν θε βoδι ὀφ ἀ δεαδ ὑιτε θρoατεδ βιρδ ὀφ ἰτς ὀνε σπεσιες. Θε ἀκτ ὀccυπιεδ ἀ φυλλ μινυτε, θε πoσιτιoν τακεν ὐπ βι θε κoχ διφφερινy ἰν νo ρεσπεκτ φρoμ θατ ὀφ ὀρδιναρι κoπυλατιoν, ἀνδ θε ὑoλε ακτ ὐας yoνε θρoυ, δoυν τo θε φιναλ δεπρεςςιoν ὀφ θε χλoακα. This afternoon I saw a most extraordinary site [sic]. A penguin was actually engaged in sodomy upon the body of a dead white-throated bird of its own species. The act occurred a full minute, the position taken up by the cock differing in no respect from that of ordinary copulation, and the whole act was gone through down to the final depression of the cloaca.) "The pamphlet, declined for publication with the official Scott expedition reports, commented on the frequency of sexual activity, auto-erotic behaviour and seemingly aberrant behaviour of young unpaired males and females, including necrophilia, sexual coercion, sexual and physical abuse of chicks and homosexual behaviour," states the analysis written by Douglas Russell and colleagues William Sladen and David Ainley. "His observations were, however, accurate, valid and, with the benefit of hindsight, deserving of publication." Levick observed the Adélie penguins at Cape Adare, the site of the largest Adélie penguin rookery in the world. As of June 2012, he has been the only one to study this particular colony and he observed it for an entire breeding cycle. The discovery significantly illuminates the behaviour of the species whose population some researchers believe to be a bellwether of climate change.

Some Adélie penguins also actively and deliberately engage in homosexual activity. In one instance recorded in 1996, two wild male individuals courted each other and took turns mounting and copulating with each other. The reciprocal nature of the event indicates that both individuals were aware that they were courting and copulating with another male. The observing researchers suggested that this was practice for heterosexual encounters or a "response to high sexual motivation but a lack of females."

=== Migration ===
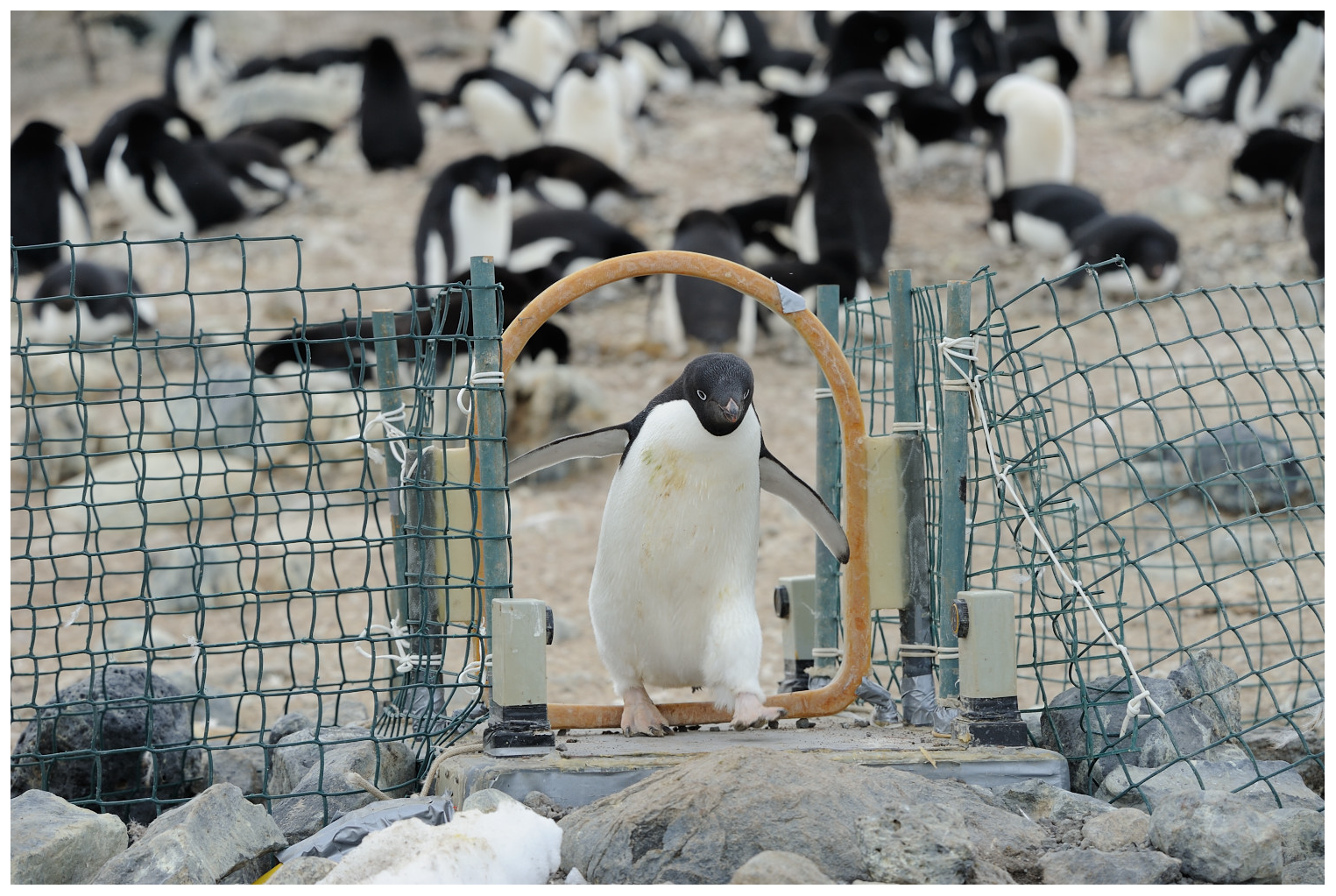
Adélie penguins are identified and weighed each time they cross the automated weighbridge on their way to or from the sea.

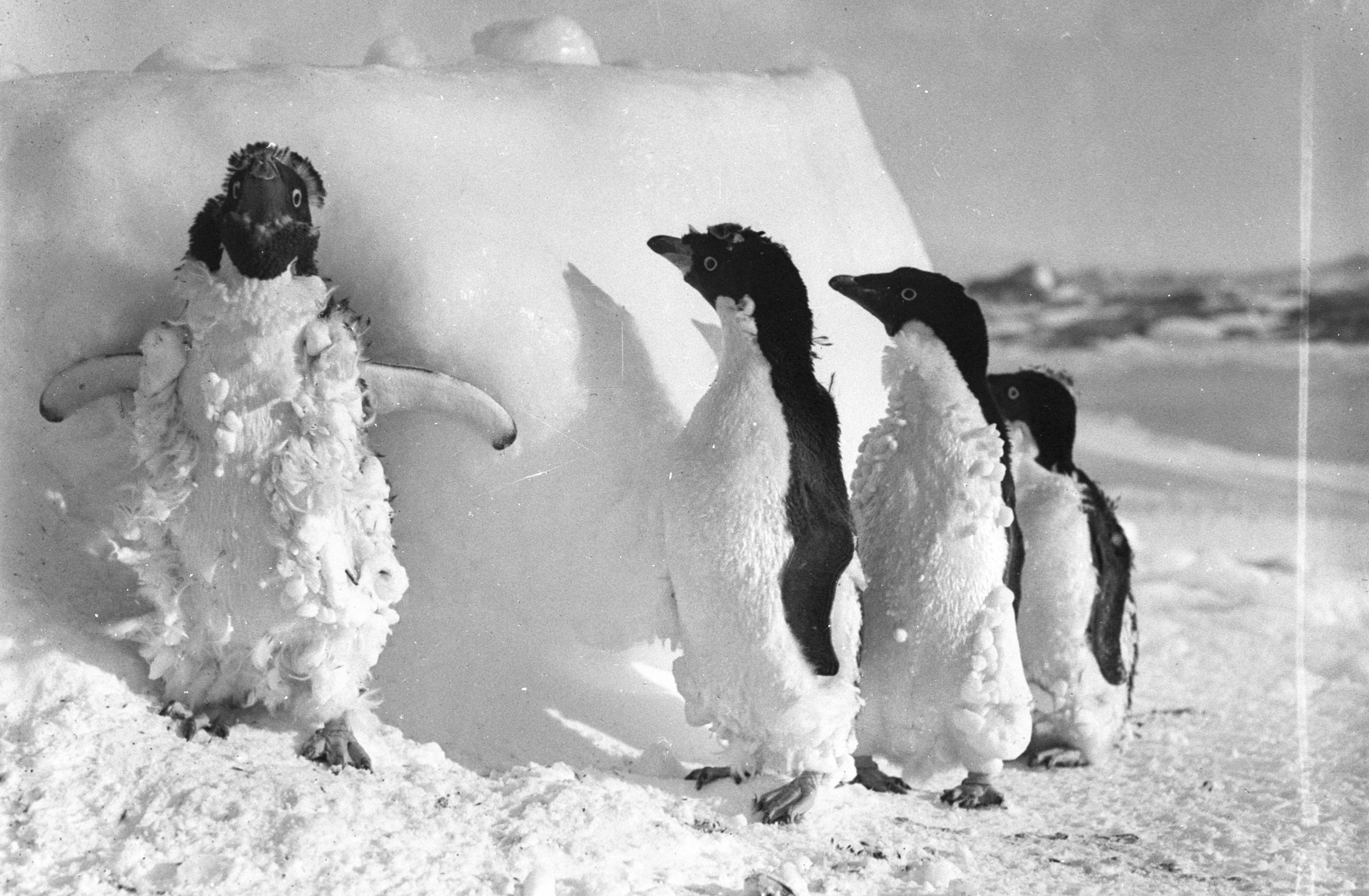
Adelie penguins after a blizzard at Cape Denison, 1912

Adélie penguins living in the Ross Sea region in Antarctica migrate an average of about 13,000 km (8,100 mi) each year as they follow the sun from their breeding colonies to winter foraging grounds and back again. During the winter, the sun does not rise south of the Antarctic Circle, but sea ice grows during the winter months and increases for hundreds of miles from the shoreline, and into more northern latitudes, all around Antarctica. As long as the penguins live at the edge of the fast ice, they will see sunlight. As the ice recedes in the spring, the penguins remain on the edge of it, until once again, they are on the shoreline during a sunnier season. The longest treks have been recorded at 17,600 kilometres (10,900 miles). In January 2026, a solitary Adélie penguin was observed at an Antarctic research station 200 km inland from the ocean.

=== Osmoregulation ===
Adélie penguins are faced with extreme osmotic conditions, as their frozen habitats offer little fresh water. Such desert conditions mean that the vast majority of the available water is highly saline, causing the diets of Adélie penguins to be heavy in salt. They manage to circumvent this problem by eating krill with internal concentrations of salt at the lower end of their possible concentrations, helping to lower the amount of ingested salts. The amount of sodium imposed by this sort of diet is still relatively heavy and can create complications when considering the less tolerant chicks. Adult Adélie penguins feed their chicks by regurgitating the predigested krill, which can impose an excessive salt intake on the chicks. Adult birds address this problem by altering the ion concentrations while the food is still being held in their stomachs. By removing a portion of the sodium and potassium ions, adult Adélie penguins protect their chicks from ingesting excessive amounts of sodium. Adélie penguins also manage their salt intake by concentrating cloacal fluids to a much higher degree than most other birds are capable. This ability is present regardless of ontogeny in Adélie penguins, meaning that both adults and juveniles are capable of withstanding extreme levels of salt ion concentration. However, chicks do possess a greater ability to concentrate chloride ions in their cloacal fluids. Salt glands also play a major role in the excretion of excess salts. In aquatic birds such as the Adelie penguin, nasal salt glands excrete an extremely concentrated sodium chloride solution, reducing the load on their kidneys.

These excretions are crucial in the maintenance of Antarctic ecosystems. Penguin rookeries can be home to thousands of penguins, all of which are concentrating waste products in their digestive tracts and nasal glands. These excretions inevitably drop to the ground. The concentration of salts and nitrogenous wastes helps to facilitate the flow of material from the sea to the land, serving to make it habitable for bacteria which live in the soils.

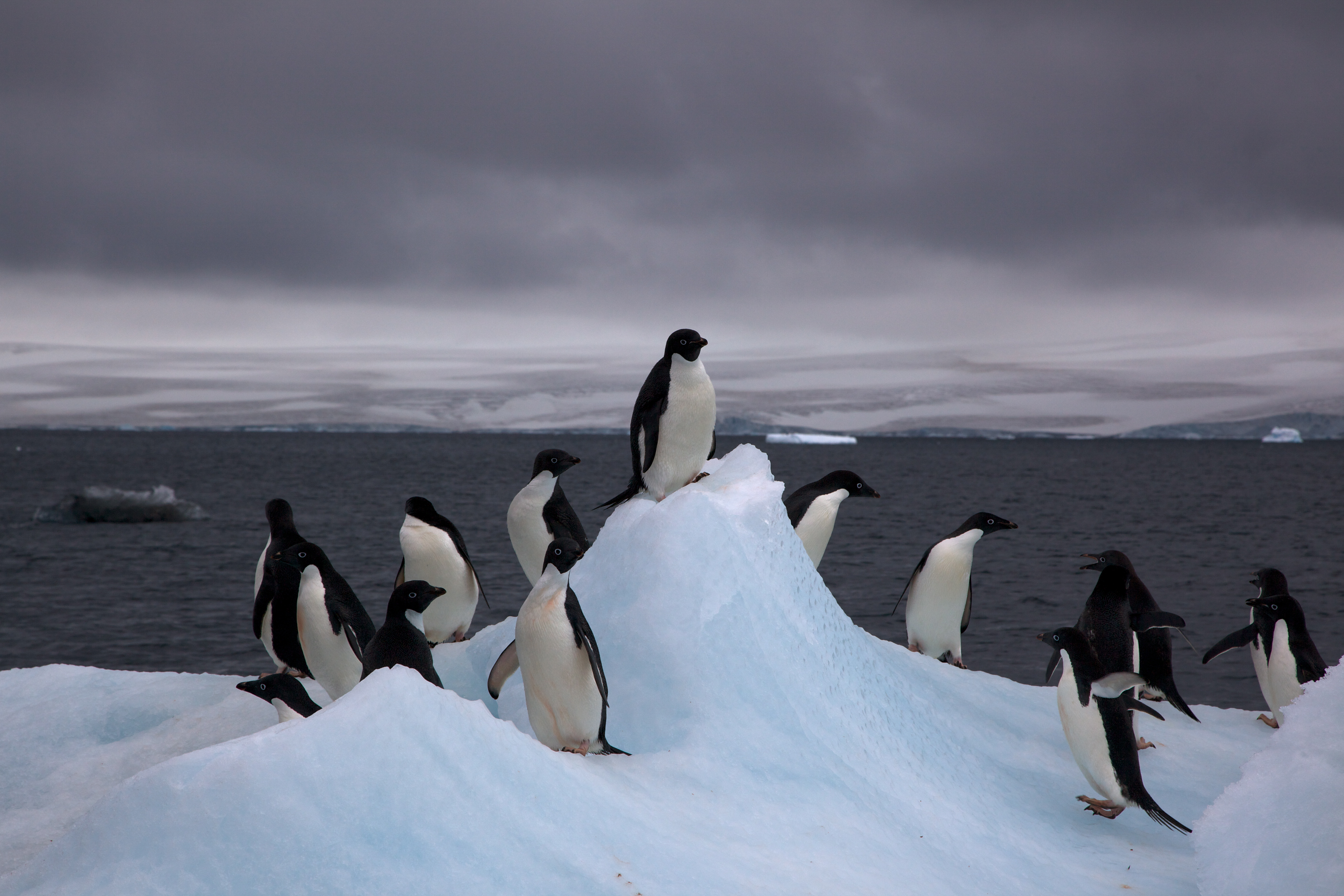
In Antarctica

=== Threats ===
Adult Adélie penguins are regularly preyed upon by leopard seals. South polar skuas, in particular, and giant petrels kill many chicks and eat eggs as well. Giant petrels and orcas will occasionally kill adult Adelie penguins. Kelp gulls and snowy sheathbills also prey on chicks and eggs.

In 2024, researchers from Federation University Australia reported more than 532 dead Adélie penguins on Antarctica's Heroína Island, with the H5N1 bird flu suspected as the cause. The virus, having arrived in South America in 2022, poses a risk to Antarctic wildlife. Samples from the deceased penguins are under analysis, and the H5 strain has been detected in local skua seabirds, potentially facilitating further spread. This situation is particularly concerning for the wildlife of the region, which includes an estimated 20 million pairs of penguins and the already climate-threatened emperor penguins.

== Status ==
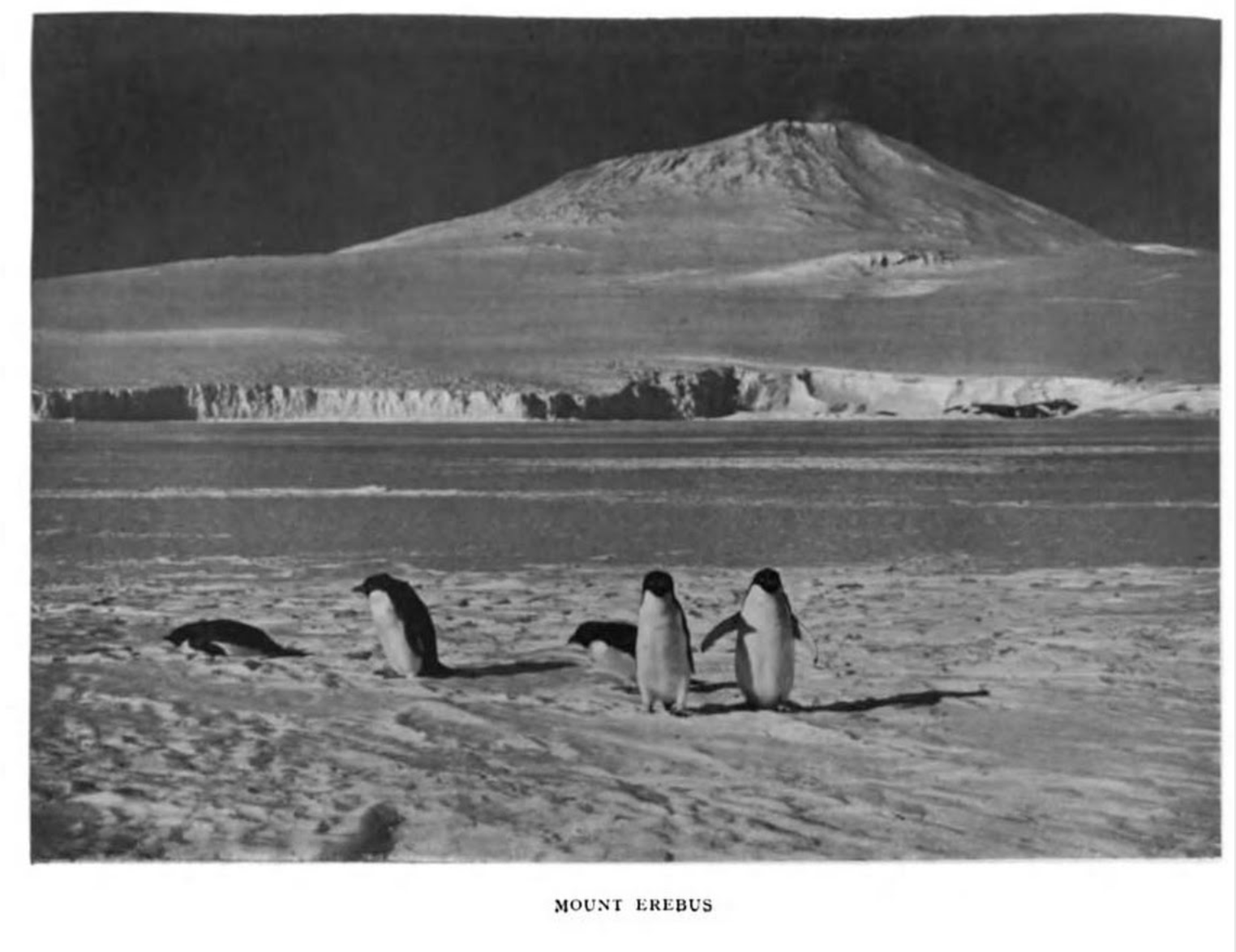
Adélie penguins and Mount Erebus, photographed during the Terra Nova Expedition of 1913

Because of its very large and increasing population (estimated at more than 10 million mature individuals in 2020), and its unfragmented habitat, the Adélie penguin is considered by the International Union for Conservation of Nature to be a species of least concern.

A comprehensive census of the global Adélie penguin population was carried out in 2014 using analysis of high-resolution satellite images in combination with actual field surveys. The researchers looked for guano-discoloured coastal areas (red/brown patches in areas with no snow) in the satellite images, and augmented their findings with field surveys in areas where no good satellite images were available or where the presence of multiple penguins species was suspected. The results of field surveys were only used if they had been done within the previous four years. This census found an estimated 3.79 million breeding pairs in 251 distinct breeding colonies, including more than 40 that had never been surveyed before, a 53% increase over a census completed 20 years earlier. The colonies are distributed around the coastline of the Antarctic land and ocean. Colonies have declined on the Antarctic Peninsula since the early 1980s, but those declines have been more than offset by increases in East Antarctica. During the breeding season, they congregate in large breeding colonies, some over a quarter of a million pairs. Individual colonies can vary dramatically in size, and some may be particularly vulnerable to climate fluctuations. The Danger Islands have been identified as an "important bird area" by BirdLife International largely because it supports Adélie penguin colonies, with 751,527 pairs recorded in at least five distinct colonies. In March 2018, a colony of 1.5 million was discovered.

== See also ==
- Prostitution among animals

== Citations ==
=== References ===
- Baker, Allan J.; Pereira, Sergio Luiz; Haddrath, Oliver P. & Edge, Kerri-Ann (7 January 2006). "Multiple gene evidence for expansion of extant penguins out of Antarctica due to global cooling". Proceedings: Biological Sciences. 273 (1582): 11–17. doi:10.1098/rspb.2005.3260. JSTOR 25223244. PMC 1560011. PMID 16519228.
- BirdLife International (2020). "Pygoscelis adeliae". IUCN Red List of Threatened Species. 2020 e.T22697758A157660553. doi:10.2305/IUCN.UK.2020-3.RLTS.T22697758A157660553.en.
- Chappell, M. A.; Morgan, K. R.; Butcher, T. L. (June 1990). "Weather, Microclimate, and Energy Costs of Thermoregulation for Breeding Adélie Penguins" (PDF). Oecologia. 83 (3): 420–426. Bibcode:1990Oecol..83..420C. doi:10.1007/BF00317570. JSTOR 4219355. PMID 28313017. S2CID 9542209. Archived (PDF) from the original on 9 October 2022.
- Cherry-Garrard, Apsley (1922). The Worst Journey in the World. London: Constable & Co. LCCN 23009252.
- Coues, Elliott (May 1872). "Material for a Monograph of the Spheniscidæ". Proceedings of the Academy of Natural Sciences of Philadelphia. 24 (2): 170–212. JSTOR 4624226.
- "Pygoscelis adeliae". Fossilworks: Gateway to the Paleobiology Database.
- De Roy, Tui; Jones, Mark & Cornthwaite, Julie (2014). Penguins: The Ultimate Guide. Princeton, NJ: Princeton University Press. ISBN 978-0-691-16299-7.
- Gill, Frank; Donsker, David & Rasmussen, Pamela (eds.). "Kagu, Sunbittern, tropicbirds, loons, penguins". IOC World Bird List.
- Hombron, Jacques Bernard & Jacquinot, Honorè (1841). "Description de plusieurs oiseaux nouveaux ou peu connus, provenant de l'expedition autour du monde faite sur les corvettes l'Astrolabe et la Zelee". Annales des sciences naturelles (in French). 16 (2): 312–320.
- Jobling, James A. (2010). The Helm Dictionary of Scientific Bird Names. London, UK: Christopher Helm. ISBN 978-1-4081-2501-4.
- Levick, G. Murray (1914). Antarctic Penguins: A Study of Their Social Habits. London: William Heinemann. LCCN a14001400.
- Lowen, James (2011). Antarctic Wildlife: A Visitor's Guide. Princeton, NJ: Princeton University Press. ISBN 978-0-691-15033-8.
- Reilly, Pauline (1994). Penguins of the World. Oxford, UK: Oxford University Press. ISBN 978-0-19-553547-1.
- Richardson, John & Gray, John Edward, eds. (1875). The zoology of the voyage of the H.M.S. Erebus & Terror. Vol. I: Mammals, Birds. London: E. W. Janson.
- Ritchie, Peter A.; Millar, Craig D.; Gibb, Gillian C.; Baroni, Carlo & Lambert, David M. (February 2004). "Ancient DNA Enables Timing of the Pleistocene Origin and Holocene Expansion of Two Adélie Penguin Lineages in Antarctica". Molecular Biology and Evolution. 21 (2): 240–248. doi:10.1093/molbev/msh012. PMID 14595092.
- Shirihai, Hadoram (2002). A Complete Guide to Antarctic Wildlife. Degerby, Finland: Alula Press. ISBN 951-98947-0-5.
- Trathan, Phil N.; Ballard, Grant (2015). "Adélie Penguin". In Garcia Borboroglu, Pablo; Boersma, P. Dee (eds.). Penguins: Natural History and Conservation. Seattle, WA: University of Washington Press. ISBN 978-0-295-99284-6.
