= Cézembre Point =

Rocky point northeast of Cape Margerie

Coordinates: 66°48′S 141°26′E

Cézembre Point is a rocky point 0.5 nautical miles (1 km) northeast of Cape Margerie. It was charted in 1950 by the French Antarctic Expedition and named for Cézembre, an island in the Gulf of Saint-Malo, France.
