= Glacial squid =

Glacial squid is a common name for several squids and may refer to:

- Galiteuthis glacialis, a species of glass squid from the Antarctic Convergence
- Psychroteuthis glacialis, the only known species in the monotypic genus Psychroteuthis
