= Whetter Nunatak =

Whetter Nunatak (66°58′S 143°1′E) is a small rock outcrop on the coastal ice slopes near the sea, situated 8 nautical miles (15 km) east-northeast of Cape Denison on the east shore of Commonwealth Bay. Discovered by the Australasian Antarctic Expedition (1911–14) under Douglas Mawson, who named it for Dr. Leslie Whetter, a surgeon with the expedition.
