= Lacroix Nunatak =

Lacroix Nunatak (66°51′S 141°20′E) is a ridge of terminal moraine, about 1 nautical mile (2 km) long and 75 metres (250 ft) high, standing immediately south of a small zone of low rocky ridges which protrude above the ice-covered point 2 nautical miles (4 km) southwest of Cape Margerie, Adélie Coast, Antarctica. It was discovered in 1931 by the British Australian New Zealand Antarctic Research Expedition, and was named by Mawson after French mineralogist Alfred Lacroix. It was photographed from the air by U.S. Navy Operation Highjump, 1946–47, and surveyed by the French Antarctic Expedition, 1949–51, which established an astronomical control station near its center.

== See also ==
- Mount Lacroix
