= Adelie Land meteorite =

Meteorite found in Antarctica

Adelie Land
- Type: Chondrite
- Class: Ordinary chondrite
- Group: L5
- Country: Antarctica
- Region: Adélie Land
- Coordinates: 67°11′S 142°23′E
- Observed fall: No
- Found date: 1912
- TKW: 1000 g

Adelie Land is a meteorite discovered at 12:35pm on December 5, 1912, in Antarctica by Francis Howard Bickerton (1889–1954), a member of Sir Douglas Mawson's Australasian Antarctic Expedition, which took place between 1911 and 1914. It was named after Adélie Land, where it was found, and it was the first meteorite found in Antarctica. The meteorite was found approximately 20 miles from the base at Cape Denison, lying in the snow in a shallow depression.

== Composition ==
One fragment was found, which weighed 2.28 pounds (1.03 kg) before it was sliced for examination by the scientists on the base. Afterwards, the specimen weighed 2.03 pounds (0.92 kg). The specimen was listed in the scientific report, published in 1923 as being "a little elongated in one direction, being 5 inches (130 mm) long, 3.5 inches (89 mm) broad, and 2.25 inches (57 mm) high. It has rather a pointed nose, and a broad, smoothly sloping tail."

The surface of the meteorite is covered with a dark brown/black crust, with some chips and cracks visible. As the meteor was sliced for study, we are able to see the core, which contains flecks of nickel-iron metal.

It was classified as L5 ordinary chondrite. The meteorite is roughly 3.49 Ga old.

== Display ==
Chemical analysis of the meteorite was carried out in the Laboratory of the Geological Survey of Victoria. After the analysis of the meteorite, and subsequent publication of scientific reports in 1923, the specimen was donated to the Australian Museum for display, where it remains to this day.

== See also ==
- Glossary of meteoritics
