= Bickerton (surname) =

Bickerton is a surname which may refer to: The name Bickerton is derived from the Old English beocere, which means bee-keeper, and tun, which originally translated to an enclosure or fence. However this came to mean a fence around a house, homestead, village or town at an early date. Thus the name can be understood to mean village of the bee-keeper. The last name originated in Malpas, Cheshire during the Norman Conquest of England, where they held a seat. The name is also estimated to have originated in Rothburg in Northumberland and Bilton, in the West Riding of Yorkshire.

Notable names:

- Alexander William Bickerton (1842–1929), first Professor of Chemistry at the University of Canterbury, teacher of Ernest Rutherford
- Ashley Bickerton (1959–2022), American artist, son of Derek Bickerton
- Arthur Bickerton (1919–1992), Australian politician
- Derek Bickerton (1926–2018), U.S. linguist
- Francis Howard Bickerton (1889–1954), British Antarctic explorer
- Jane Howard, Duchess of Norfolk (1643/4-1693), née Bickerton
- Louie Bickerton (1902–1998), Australian female tennis player
- Sir Richard Bickerton, 1st Baronet (1727–1792), British Royal Navy rear admiral
- Sir Richard Bickerton, 2nd Baronet (1759–1832), British Royal Navy admiral
- Thomas Bickerton (born 1958), U.S. bishop in the United Methodist Church
- Wayne Bickerton (1941–2015), British songwriter, record producer and music business executive
- William Bickerton (1815–1905), founder of the Church of Jesus Christ (Bickertonite), a restorationist Christian church with roots in the Latter Day Saint movement
