= Gravenoire Rock =

Gravenoire Rock (66°21′S 136°43′E) is a small rock outcrop about 1 nautical mile (2 km) southeast of Rock X, protruding above the coastal ice at the east side of Victor Bay, Antarctica. It was photographed from the air by U.S. Navy Operation Highjump, 1946–1947, was charted by the French Antarctic Expedition, 1952–1953, and so named by them because of its resemblance to Gravenoire, the name of a puy or dome-shaped hill overlooking the city of Clermont-Ferrand, which lies in the chain of extinct volcanoes forming the Monts d'Auvergne of central France.
