= Frank Bickerton =

English explorer of the Antarctic

Francis Howard Bickerton
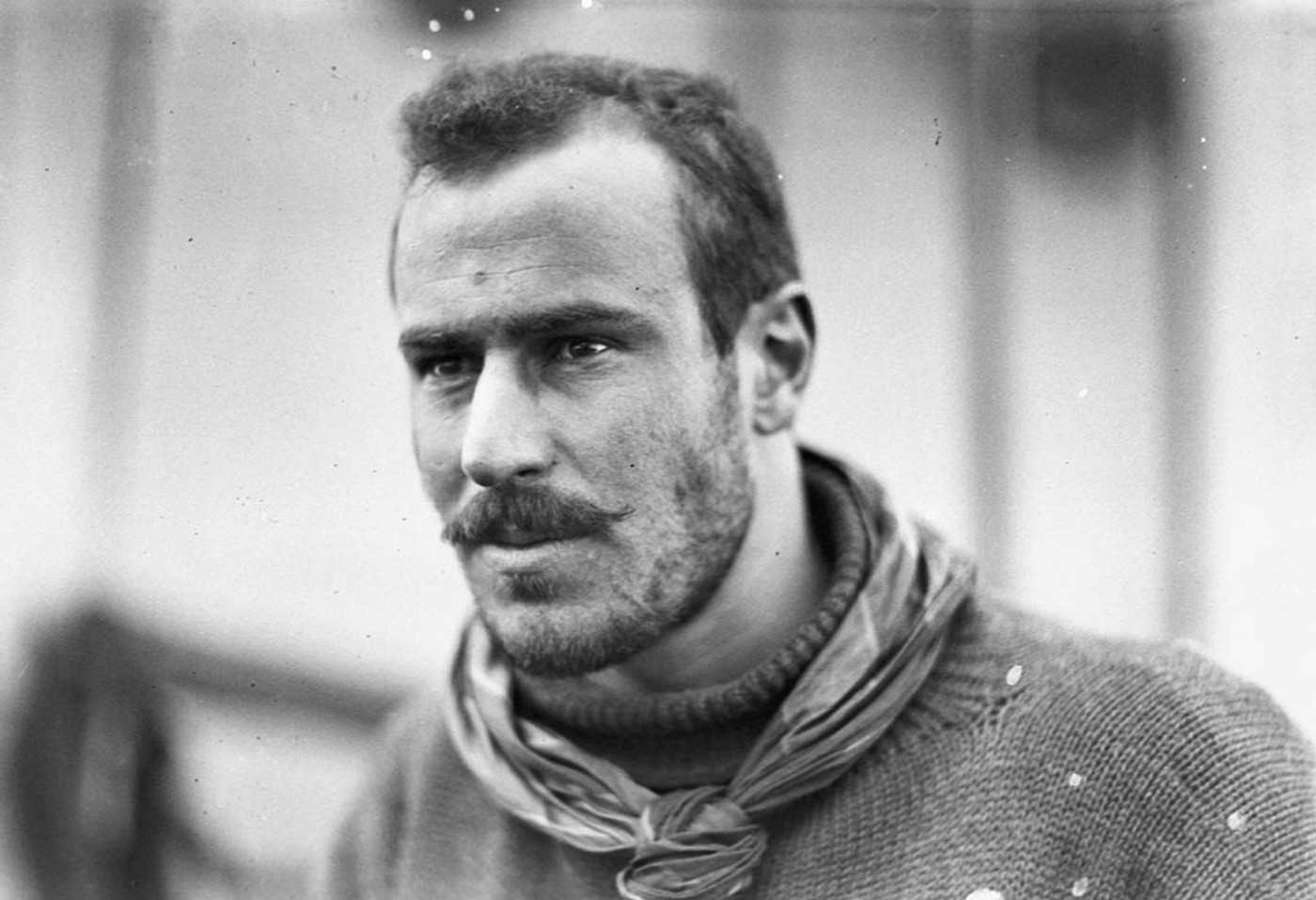
- Born: 15 January 1889; Iffley, Oxfordshire, England
- Died: 21 August 1954 (aged 65); Borth, Cardiganshire, Wales
- Occupations: Explorer and aviator

Francis Howard Bickerton (15 January 1889 – 21 August 1954) was an English treasure hunter, Antarctic explorer, soldier, aeronaut, entrepreneur, big-game hunter and movie-maker. He not only made a major contribution to the Australasian Antarctic Expedition of 1911–1914 but was also recruited for Sir Ernest Shackleton's "Endurance" Expedition; he fought with the infantry, the Royal Flying Corps and the Royal Air Force in both world wars and was wounded on no fewer than four occasions. According to his obituary in The Times, "His loyalty to his friends, his gallantry... and the unembittered courage with which he continued to meet the difficulties of a world which gave little recognition in peace to men of his mould – leave to us who shared in one way or another his various life the memory of a rich, rewarding and abiding spirit".

Bickerton was a friend of author Vita Sackville-West and was the model for the character of Leonard Anquetil in her 1930 novel The Edwardians.

== Early life ==
Francis Howard Bickerton was born in Iffley, Oxfordshire, on 15 January 1889, the son of Joseph Jones Bickerton (1839–1894), liberal councillor and town clerk of Oxford, and his second wife Eliza Frances Fox (1849–1896). After the early deaths of both parents, Bickerton and his sister, Dorothea, became the wards of their maternal uncle, the neurologist Dr Edward Lawrence Fox (1859–1938), living at 9 Osborne Place in Plymouth, Devon. Bickerton received his early schooling from Joseph John Cross at Newton Abbot Hall before moving on to Marlborough College, where he boarded from 1901 to 1904. In 1906 he enrolled at London's City & Guilds (Technical) College where he became one of the college's first students to study aeronautical engineering. There is no record of Bickerton ever having formally graduated, but around 1910 he went to work in one of the iron foundries in Bedford and, while resident in that town, he met and became friends with the Antarctic explorer Aeneas Mackintosh (a veteran of Shackleton's Nimrod Expedition). In March 1911 the two men embarked upon a treasure-hunting expedition to Cocos Island but returned empty-handed three months later.

== The Australasian Antarctic Expedition (AAE), 1911–1914 ==
Immediately upon his return from Cocos Island, Bickerton volunteered for the Australasian Antarctic Expedition led by Dr Douglas Mawson. Mawson had determined to take a Vicker's REP monoplane to undertake survey work and Bickerton was appointed as mechanical engineer with responsibility for the maintenance of this, the first powered aircraft in Antarctica. During a trial flight in Adelaide on 5 October 1911, however, the aeroplane crashed, slightly injuring the pilot, Hugh Watkins, and his passenger, Frank Wild. With the monoplane too badly damaged for further attempts at flight, Mawson ordered Bickerton to convert it into an "air-tractor" which would then be used for hauling supplies and for exploration during the expedition. The expedition ship, the Steam Yacht "Aurora" sailed from Hobart, Tasmania, on 2 December 1911. After dropping a small party on Macquarie Island in order to establish a wireless relay station, the "Aurora" sailed for the Antarctic on 23 December and reached Cape Denison, Commonwealth Bay, Antarctica on 8 January 1912.

Over the next eleven months, Bickerton spent the majority of his time working on the conversion of the wrecked monoplane and on the erection of the two huge wireless masts intended to enable, for the first time in the history of Antarctic exploration, direct communication between an Antarctic base-camp and civilization. In October 1912, Bickerton was also chosen to lead one of the expedition's four main sledging parties. His particular task would be to steer the air-tractor along the western coast of Commonwealth Bay, accompanied by Dr Leslie Whetter and Alfred Hodgeman. Bickerton and his companions began their trek on 3 December 1912, with Bickerton piloting the heavily laden air-tractor and Whetter and Hodgeman proceeding on foot. Almost immediately, however, the machine became a cause for concern and, on the following day, the engine seized so abruptly that the propeller was smashed; with no spare-parts and with little or no time to effect repairs, the three men agreed to abandon the aeroplane and to proceed on foot. Despite this disappointment, the following day, 5 December, marked an important milestone in Antarctic science, with the discovery of a 1 kg olivine-hypersthene – the first meteorite ever to be found in Antarctica. The discovery of the Adelie Land Meteorite would prove to be the first step in identifying Antarctica as the richest meteorite field on the face of the planet. Over the next few weeks, despite appalling weather conditions, Bickerton's three-man team man-hauled their sledges across approximately 1,600 miles (2,600 km) of previously unexplored territory, eventually returning to base-camp on 18 January 1913. The Western Sledging Party was the last-but-one to return: Douglas Mawson's Far-Eastern Sledging Party, consisting of Mawson, Belgrave Ninnis and Xavier Mertz, was still missing. It would eventually transpire that Ninnis had been killed by a fall down a crevasse and, with the loss of the bulk of their supplies on Ninnis's sledge, Mertz and Mawson had been forced to immediately embark on their return journey. During its course, however, Mertz had succumbed to exhaustion and starvation, leaving a malnourished Mawson to undertake a solitary trek of more than 100 miles (160 km). By the time that Mawson reached base-camp in early February, the "Aurora" had been forced to depart in order to avoid being iced-in and a relief party of six men, including Bickerton, had been left behind to search for the missing sledgers. This party would remain in Antarctica until the ship's eventual return on 12 December 1913. For his services to Antarctic exploration, including his work on the continent's first propeller-driven sledge, his important contribution to establishing the first wireless link with Antarctica and his discovery of the first Antarctic meteorite, Bickerton was awarded the King's Polar Medal in silver and Mawson chose to name Cape Bickerton (6620S, 13656E, five miles (8 km) ENE of Gravenoire Rock) in his honour.

== Imperial Trans-Antarctic Expedition, 1914–1917 ==
While still in Antarctica, Bickerton had learned about and volunteered for Sir Ernest Shackleton's Imperial Trans-Antarctic (or "Endurance") Expedition. Shackleton intended to take a number of motor-driven sledges on his expedition, including one very similar in design to the converted REP monoplane. As the only man ever to have attempted the use of such a machine in Antarctica, Bickerton's expertise was second-to-none and his application was accepted. In May 1914, Bickerton accompanied Shackleton, Frank Wild, George Marston and Thomas Orde-Lees to Finse in Norway to test the propeller-sledge. Shortly after the party's return from Norway, Britain declared war on Germany and Bickerton decided to abandon any plans for a return to Antarctica and instead joined the Army.

== World War I ==
On 11 September 1914, Bickerton enlisted with the 16th (Public Schools) Battalion of the Middlesex Regiment. He soon applied for an officer's commission, however, and in April 1915, he joined the 7th (Service) Battalion of the Royal Sussex Regiment as a platoon commander in D Company under Captain G.H. Impey. The Battalion crossed to France on 31 May 1915 and a few days later took up a position near Armentieres on the River Leys. It was here, on 28 June, that the Battalion lost its first officer, Captain John Bussell, Bickerton's brother-in-law, being shot through the head during an inspection of the trenches. The Battalion then played a minor role in the Battle of Loos during September with most of its casualties being suffered by D Company.

In May 1916, Bickerton volunteered to serve as an aerial gunner and observer with the Royal Flying Corps. Posted to 10 Squadron near Bethune, Bickerton served on BE2cs, acting as observer for an Australian pilot named Ewart Garland. This period formed the basis for the novel Wings of the Morning written by Patrick Garland, the theatre director and son of Ewart Garland. Throughout July 1916, 10 Squadron supported ground troops during the Battle of the Somme and on 31 July, Bickerton received his first wound of the war, a piece of shrapnel piercing his flying jacket and wounding him in the shoulder. On 16 August, he was injured again, far more seriously. With flying made impossible by low cloud cover, Bickerton and other officers experimented with a home-made anti-aircraft gun. During the experiments, the gun exploded, practically severing both of Bickerton's thumbs and tearing open his right cheek.

From August 1916 to February 1917, Bickerton recuperated in England. He then attended the No 1 School of Military Aeronautics at Reading and the Central Flying School at Upavon in Wiltshire, where he trained as a pilot. After a brief spell as a temporary instructor at Upavon, he joined 70 Squadron at Estree Blanche on 21 July 1917. 70 Squadron was the first to be equipped with the notoriously difficult but hugely successful British fighter, the Sopwith Camel. In the following weeks, Bickerton and his colleagues saw constant action and Bickerton claimed two victories: an Albatros D on 22 August over Houthulst Forest and a Fokker triplane on 10 September over Roulers. It was also during this period (3 September) that Bickerton became one of the first men to use the Sopwith Camel as a night-fighter. Finally, on 20 September, during an attack on three barrage balloons, he was again seriously wounded by a bullet which passed through his thigh and amputated the little finger of his left hand. As a result, Bickerton was again invalided home.

Bickerton's final injuries of the war were suffered in May 1918, when he was serving as a test pilot at the Aeroplane Experimental Station at Martlesham Heath in Suffolk. On 18 May, he was testing bomb-aiming equipment in a Vickers Vimy bomber. When the aeroplane suffered simultaneous failure in both its engines, forcing Bickerton to attempt a crash-landing. The resulting smash destroyed the aeroplane and left Bickerton with concussion and broken fingers.

== Post-War ==
In 1920, Bickerton joined fellow Antarctic veterans, Frank Wild and Dr James McIlroy, on an expedition to East Africa. Having heard what Wild called "wondrous accounts of the possibility of making rapid and colossal fortunes in Portuguese East Africa by growing tobacco", the three men planned to become farmers. Having found the Portuguese authorities "impossible" they moved on to Fort Johnstone in British Nyasaland where they cleared 250 acres (1.0 km^{2}) of forest. During this process, however, Bickerton contracted malaria and was forced to return to Europe.

Having spent some time in Paris with his friend, the artist Cuthbert Orde, he travelled in Newfoundland, where he joined a colony of ex-pats established by Antarctic veteran Captain Victor Campbell. During the late 1920s, Bickerton regularly travelled between Newfoundland and England, combining the lives of a Canadian backwoodsman with that of a fashionable party-goer in the London of the Roaring Twenties. It was during this period that the novelists Stella Benson and Vita Sackville-West both became acquainted with the explorer. The former fell passionately in love with Bickerton and asked him to become the father of her child (an honour which Bickerton declined), while the latter took Bickerton as the model for Leonard Anquetil, the hero of her best novel, The Edwardians (1930).

In 1928, Bickerton abandoned his farm in Newfoundland and decided to invest capital in a company founded by the American equestrian and golfing champion, Marion Hollins. Ultimately, he would become heavily involved in the development of the Pasatiempo Country Club in Santa Cruz, working closely with both Hollins and the world-famous golf-course designer, Dr Alister MacKenzie. It was also during this period that Bickerton commenced what would ultimately become a disastrous love-affair with Marion Hollins's niece, Hope Hollins. The acrimonious break-up of the affair saw Bickerton quarrel with his business partner and, with the onset of the Wall Street Crash, he eventually fled the US and returned to England, a disillusioned and unhappy man.

During 1932–1933, Bickerton embarked on a world tour in company with William Rhodes-Moorhouse and Tom Hanbury. Having travelled from England to New York and then through British Columbia shooting grizzly bear, the trio sailed from the East Coast of America to South Africa on board a cargo ship. They then travelled by train, plane and automobile from Cape Town to Cairo, frequently pausing to hunt.

Back in England, Bickerton took up a role within the film industry, working as screenwriter and film-editor on a range of films, including My Irish Molly with Maureen O'Hara and an adaptation of Jack London's Mutiny of the Elsinore with the future Oscar-winner Paul Lukas.

On 27 May 1937, Bickerton married Lady Joan Chetwynd-Talbot, sister of the Earl of Shrewsbury, by whom he had one daughter.

With the outbreak of the Second World War, Bickerton immediately volunteered for service and was sent to France with the air contingent of the British Expeditionary Force. He served with distinction throughout the war, ending with the rank of Wing Commander, mentioned-in-despatches.

Frank Bickerton died on 21 August 1954 in the Welsh town of Borth in Cardiganshire.

== Bibliography ==
- Born Adventurer: The Life of Frank Bickerton, Antarctic Pioneer by Stephen Haddelsey (Sutton Publishing, 2005)
- The Wings of the Morning by Patrick Garland (Bantam Books, 1990)
- The Edwardians by Vita Sackville-West (Virago, 2000)
