= Ravin Bay =

Bay in Antarctica

Ravin Bay (66°32′S 138°27′E) is a small bay between Cape Pépin and the point where Français Glacier discharges into the sea in Adélie Land, Antarctica. Discovered in 1840 by a French expedition under Captain Jules Dumont d'Urville, it was named by him for the aspect of the coast, "ravin" being French for ravine.
