= List of glaciers of Adélie Land =

Location of Adélie Land

Following is a list of glaciers of Adélie Land in Antarctica. This list may not reflects recently named glaciers in Adélie Land.

Name	Coordinates	Length
Astrolabe Glacier	66°45′S 139°55′E	10 nautical miles (19 km; 12 mi)
Barré Glacier	66°35′S 138°40′E	5 nautical miles (9.3 km; 5.8 mi)
Commandant Charcot Glacier	66°25′S 136°35′E	12 nautical miles (22 km; 14 mi)
Français Glacier	66°33′S 138°15′E	12 nautical miles (22 km; 14 mi)
Liotard Glacier	66°37′S 139°30′E	6 nautical miles (11 km; 6.9 mi)
Marret Glacier	66°26′S 137°44′E	4 nautical miles (7.4 km; 4.6 mi)
Zélée Glacier	66°52′S 141°10′E	6 nautical miles (11 km; 6.9 mi)

== Astrolabe Glacier ==
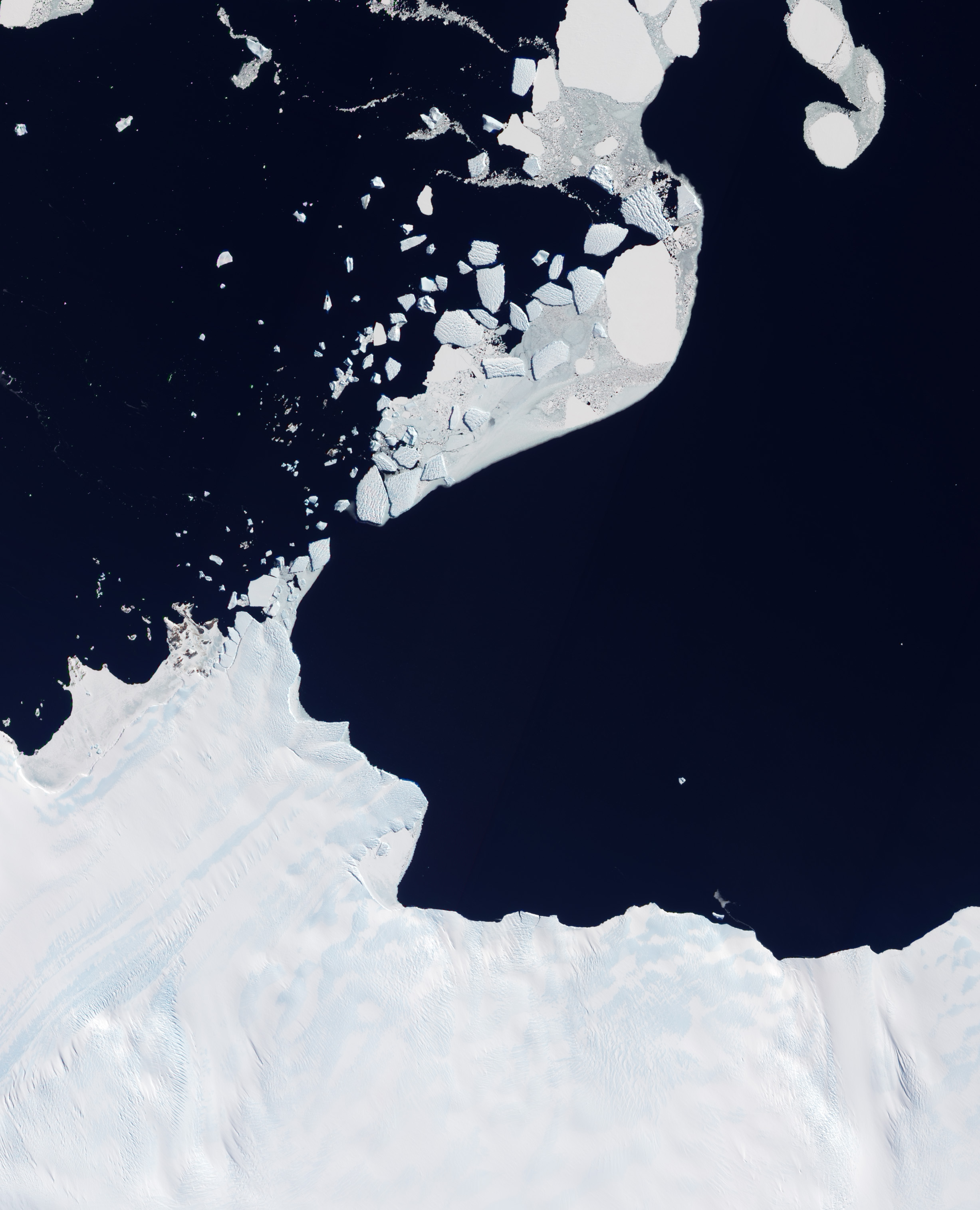
Natural-colour satellite image of Astrolabe Glacier

66°45′S 139°55′E. Glacier 4 nautical miles (7.4 km; 4.6 mi) wide and 10 nautical miles (19 km; 12 mi) long, flowing north-north-east from the continental ice and terminating at the coast in a prominent tongue at the east side of Géologie Archipelago. Probably first sighted in 1840 by the French expedition under Capt. Jules Dumont d'Urville, although no glaciers were noted on d'Urville's chart of this coast. Photographed from the air by United States Navy (USN) Operation Highjump (OpHjp) in January 1947. It was charted by the French Antarctic Expedition (FrAE), 1949–51, and named after d'Urville's flagship, the Astrolabe. Not: Glacier Geologic, Glacier Terra-Nova.

=== Astrolabe Glacier Tongue ===
66°42′S 140°05′E. Prominent glacier tongue about 3 nautical miles (5.6 km; 3.5 mi) wide and 4 nautical miles (7.4 km; 4.6 mi) long, extending northeast from Astrolabe Glacier at the east end of Géologie Archipelago. Delineated from air photos taken by USN OpHjp, 1946-47, and named for the French corvette Astrolabe.

== Barré Glacier ==
66°35′S 138°40′E Channel glacier about 5 nautical miles (9.3 km; 5.8 mi) wide and 5 nautical miles (9.3 km; 5.8 mi) long, flowing north from the continental ice to the coast close east of Cape Pépin. Delineated from air photos taken by USN OpHjp, 1946-47, and named by the US-ACAN for Michel Barré, leader of the FrAE wintering party of 1951-52, whose party extended reconnaissance of the coastal features as far westward as this glacier.

== Commandant Charcot Glacier ==
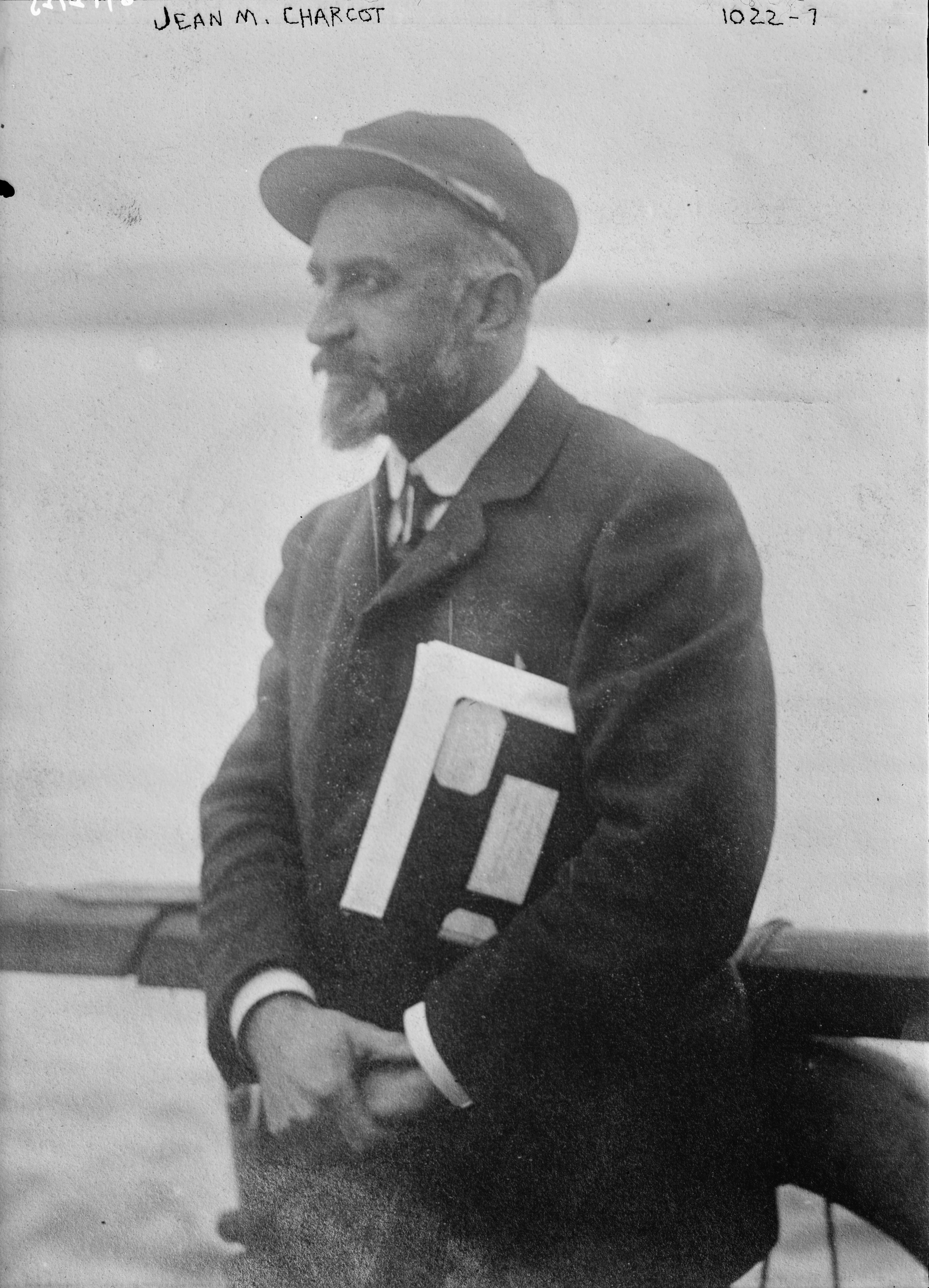
Jean-Baptiste Charcot, commandant of the French Antarctic Expedition 1903–05

66°25′S 136°35′E. Prominent glacier about 3 nautical miles (5.6 km; 3.5 mi) wide and 12 nautical miles (22 km; 14 mi) long, flowing north-north-west from the continental ice to its terminus at the head of Victor Bay. Delineated from aerial photographs taken by USN OpHjp, 1946-47. The FrAE under Marret sledged west along the coast to Victor Bay, close east of this glacier, in December 1952. Named by the FrAE for the polar ship Commandant Charcot which transported French expeditions to this area, 1948-52. Not: Commandant Drovcot Glacier.

== Français Glacier ==
66°33′S 138°15′E. Glacier 4 nautical miles (7.4 km; 4.6 mi) wide and 12 nautical miles (22 km; 14 mi) long, flowing north-north-east from the continental ice to the coast close west of Ravin Bay. Though no glaciers were noted on Capt. Jules Dumont d'Urville's chart of this coast, the close correlation of his "Baie des Ravins" feature and narrative description with the indentation of the coast near the mouth of this glacier suggests first sighting of this feature by the French expedition, 1837-40. During December 1912 members of the Main Base Party of the Australasian Antarctic Expedition (AAE) camped on the upland slopes close east of the glacier, but no reference was made to the glacier in the AAE reports, though a clear view and unpublished sketch were obtained of the distant coast to the northwest. Delineated from air photos taken by USN OpHjp, 1946-47. The FrAE under Marret, 1952-53, sledged west on the sea ice to the ice cliffs close east of the glacier. Named after the Français, expedition ship of the FrAE under Dr. Jean-Baptiste Charcot, 1903–05. Not: Glacier Endurance.

== Liotard Glacier ==
66°37′S 139°30′E. Channel glacier about 3 nautical miles (5.6 km; 3.5 mi) wide and 6 nautical miles (11 km; 6.9 mi) long, flowing north-north-east from the continental ice and terminating in a small tongue about 4 nautical miles (7.4 km; 4.6 mi) west of Hélène Island. Delineated from air photos taken by USN OpHjp, 1946-47, and named by the US-ACAN for André Liotard, leader of the FrAE, 1949-51, whose group completed the initial survey of the coastal features as far westward as this glacier. Not: Ebba Glacier.

== Marret Glacier ==
66°26′S 137°44′E. Channel glacier about 4 nautical miles (7.4 km; 4.6 mi) wide and 4 nautical miles (7.4 km; 4.6 mi) long, flowing northeast from the continental ice to the coast close east of Cape Robert. Delineated from aerial photos taken by USN OpHjp, 1946-47, and named by the US-ACAN for Mario Marret, leader of the FrAE, 1952-53, whose party extended reconnaissance of the coastal features to the west side of Victor Bay.

== Zélée Glacier ==
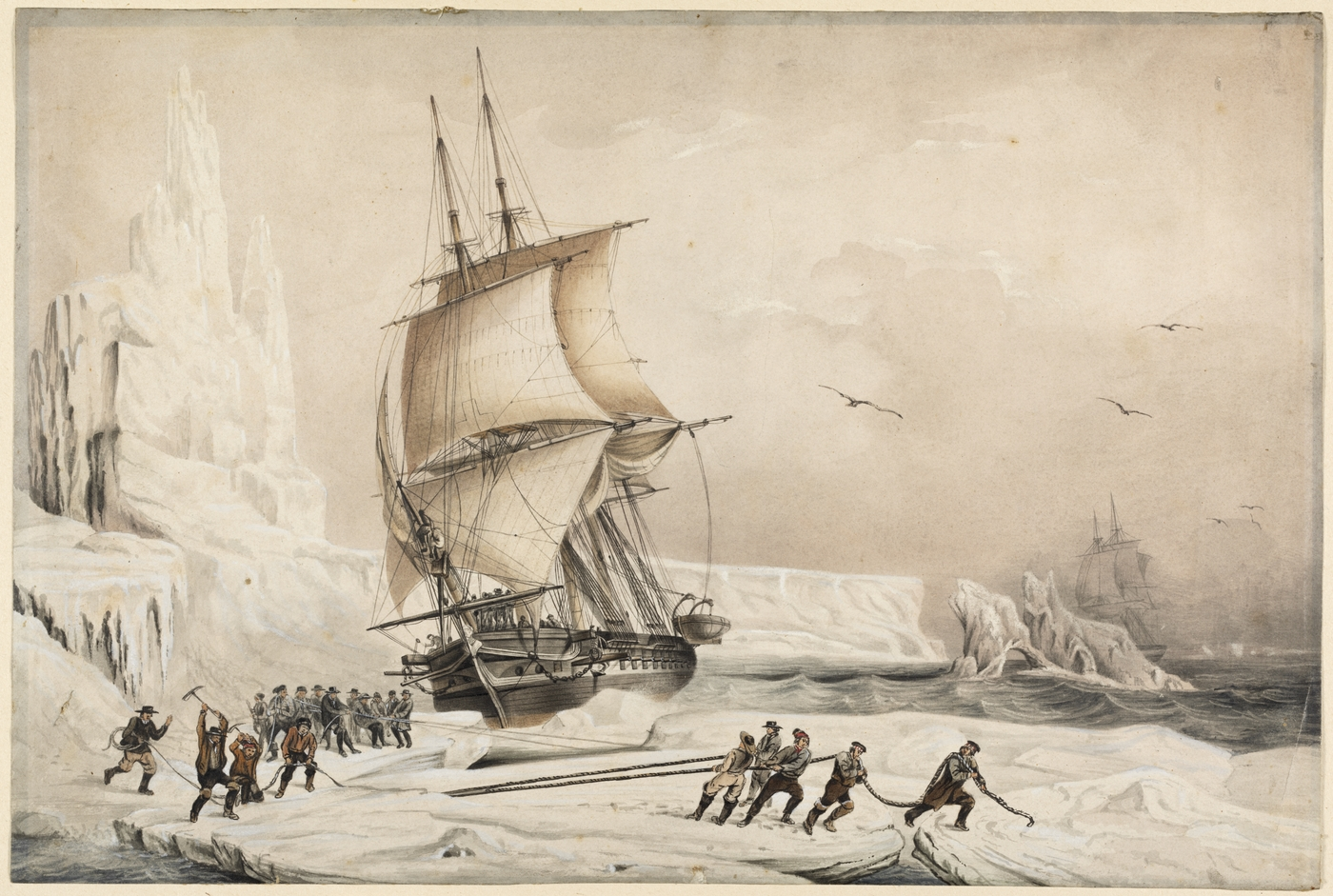
The Astrolabe and the Zélée caught in Antarctic ice, watercolour by A. Mayer. (1838)

66°52′S 141°10′E. Glacier about 3 nautical miles (5.6 km; 3.5 mi) wide and 6 nautical miles (11 km; 6.9 mi) long, flowing north-north-west from the continental ice along the west side of Lacroix Nunatak and terminating in a prominent tongue at the west side of Port Martin. Probably first sighted in 1840 by the French expedition under Capt. Jules Dumont d'Urville, although no glaciers were noted on d'Urville's chart of this coast. Photographed from the air by USN OpHjp, 1946-47. Charted by the FrAE under Liotard, 1949-51, and named for the Zélée, corvette which accompanied d'Urville's flagship, the Astrolabe. Not: Glacier Penola.

=== Zélée Glacier Tongue ===
66°47′S 141°10′E. A glacier tongue about 2 nautical miles (3.7 km; 2.3 mi) wide and 7 nautical miles (13 km; 8.1 mi) long which extends seaward from Zélée Glacier. Delineated from air photos taken by U.S. Navy Operation Highjump, 1946–47, and named for the French corvette Zélée.

== Sources ==
- Alberts, Fred G., ed. (1995), Geographic Names of the Antarctic (PDF) (2 ed.), United States Board on Geographic Names This article incorporates public domain material from websites or documents of the United States Board on Geographic Names.
