= Cape Margerie =

Cape in Adélie Land, Antarctica

Cape Margerie (66°49′S 141°23′E) is a low, ice-covered cape in Antarctica, marked by prominent rock outcrops at its northern end, lying midway between Cape Mousse and Lacroix Nunatak and bounded on the north by numerous rocky islands. It was charted by the Australasian Antarctic Expedition under Mawson, 1911–14, who named this feature for Emmanuel de Margerie, a French geographer and geologist. Bleue Cove lies immediately east.

Cape Margerie served as the main base site for French Antarctic Expedition parties under André-Frank Liotard, in 1950–51, and Michel Barré, in 1951–52, until fire destroyed the main buildings of their base, known as Port Martin, in January 1952.

== See also ==
- Cézembre Point
