= Victor Bay =

Bay in Antarctica

Victor Bay (66°20′S 136°30′E) is a bay about 30 kilometres (16 nmi) wide and 13 kilometres (7 nmi) long, indenting the coast between Pourquoi Pas Point and Mathieu Rock, Antarctica. The bay is marked by an extensive chain of icebergs breaking away from the high tongue of Commandant Charcot Glacier. It was delineated from aerial photographs taken by U.S. Navy Operation Highjump, 1946–47, and named by the Advisory Committee on Antarctic Names (US-ACAN) for Paul-Emile Victor, the Director of the Expéditions polaires françaises, who organized French expeditions to Greenland in 1948-51 and Antarctica in 1948-53 and 1955–56.

== Sources ==
- Alberts, Fred G., ed. (1995), Geographic Names of the Antarctic (PDF) (2 ed.), United States Board on Geographic Names This article incorporates public domain material from websites or documents of the United States Board on Geographic Names.
