= Bon Docteur Nunatak =

Coastal nunatak in Antarctica

Coordinates: 66°40′S 140°1′E

Bon Docteur Nunatak, also known as Good Doctor Nunatak, is a small coastal nunatak, 28 metres (92 ft) high, standing at the west side of the Astrolabe Glacier Tongue, 400 m (1,300 ft) south of Rostand Island in the Géologie Archipelago of Antarctica. It was photographed from the air by U.S. Navy Operation Highjump, 1946–47, charted by the French Antarctic Expedition, 1952–53, and named for Dr Jean Cendron, the "good doctor", medical officer and biologist with the French Antarctic Expedition, 1951–52.

== Antarctic Specially Protected Area ==
A site cluster in the heart of the Géologie Archipelago, south and east, and in the immediate vicinity, of Petrel Island and Dumont d'Urville Station, comprises Bon Docteur Nunatak, Jean Rostand, Le Mauguen, Claude Bernard and Lamarck Islands, and a breeding site of emperor penguins on the intervening sea ice. The site is protected under the Antarctic Treaty System as Antarctic Specially Protected Area (ASPA) No.120. It was designated as such because it contains representative examples of terrestrial Antarctic ecosystems. Apart from the emperor penguin colony, the only one of about 30 in Antarctica that lies close to a permanent research station, birds nesting in the area include Adélie penguins, Antarctic skuas, Wilson's storm petrels, southern giant petrels, snow petrels and Cape petrels. Weddell seals also occur there.
