= Lamarck Island (Antarctica) =

Island in Adélie Land, Antarctica

- Location within Antarctica

Geography
- Location: Antarctica
- Coordinates: 66°40′S 140°2′E

Administration
- Administered under the Antarctic Treaty System

Demographics
- Population: Uninhabited

Lamarck Island is a rocky island 250 m (820 ft) long, lying 300 m (980 ft) east of Petrel Island and 300 m (980 ft) north-east of Rostand Island in the Géologie Archipelago, off the Adélie Coast of Antarctica. It was charted in 1951 by the French Antarctic Expedition and named by them after Jean-Baptiste Lamarck, the French naturalist.

== Antarctic Specially Protected Area ==
A site cluster in the heart of the Géologie Archipelago, south and east, and in the immediate vicinity, of Petrel Island and Dumont d'Urville Station, comprises Lamarck, Jean Rostand, Le Mauguen and Claude Bernard Islands, Bon Docteur Nunatak, and a breeding site of emperor penguins on the intervening sea ice. The site is protected under the Antarctic Treaty System as Antarctic Specially Protected Area (ASPA) No.120. It was designated as such because it contains representative examples of terrestrial Antarctic ecosystems. Apart from the emperor penguin colony, the only one of about 30 in Antarctica that lies close to a permanent research station, birds nesting in the area include Adélie penguins, Antarctic skuas, Wilson's storm petrels, southern giant petrels, snow petrels and Cape petrels. Weddell seals also occur there.

== See also ==
- List of Antarctic and subantarctic islands
