= Bernard Island =

Island in Adélie Land, Antarctica

- Location within Antarctica

Geography
- Location: Antarctica
- Coordinates: 66°40′S 140°2′E
- Archipelago: Géologie Archipelago
- Length: 400 m (1300 ft)

Administration
- Administered under the Antarctic Treaty System

Demographics
- Population: Uninhabited

Bernard Island is a rocky island 400 m long lying 500 m east of the Petrel Island in the Géologie Archipelago of Antarctica. It was charted in 1951 by a French Antarctic Expedition and named by them for Claude Bernard, a noted French physiologist.

== Antarctic Specially Protected Area ==
A site cluster in the heart of the Géologie Archipelago, south and east, and in the immediate vicinity, of Petrel Island and Dumont d'Urville Station, comprises Bernard, Jean Rostand, Le Mauguen and Lamarck Islands, Bon Docteur Nunatak, and a breeding site of emperor penguins on the intervening sea ice. The site is protected under the Antarctic Treaty System as Antarctic Specially Protected Area (ASPA) No.120. It was designated as such because it contains representative examples of terrestrial Antarctic ecosystems. Apart from the emperor penguin colony, the only one of about 30 in Antarctica that lies close to a permanent research station, birds nesting in the area include Adélie penguins, Antarctic skuas, Wilson's storm petrels southern giant petrels, snow petrels and Cape petrels. Weddell seals also occur there.

== See also ==
- List of Antarctic and subantarctic islands
