= Carrel Island =

Island in Adélie Land, Antarctica

Le Mauguen
- Location within Antarctica

Geography
- Location: Antarctica
- Coordinates: 66°40′S 140°1′E
- Archipelago: Géologie Archipelago
- Length: 400 m (1300 ft)

Administration
- Administered under the Antarctic Treaty System

Demographics
- Population: Uninhabited

Carrel Island, also known as Le Mauguen Island, is a small, rocky island 400 metres (1,300 ft) long lying 200 metres (660 ft) south of Petrel Island in the Géologie Archipelago of Antarctica. It was charted in 1950 by the French Antarctic Expedition and named by them for Alexis Carrel, noted French surgeon and physiologist.

== Antarctic Specially Protected Area ==
A site cluster in the heart of the Géologie Archipelago, south and east, and in the immediate vicinity, of Petrel Island and Dumont d'Urville Station, comprises Carrel, Jean Rostand, Claude Bernard and Lamarck Islands, Bon Docteur Nunatak, and a breeding site of emperor penguins on the intervening sea ice. The site is protected under the Antarctic Treaty System as Antarctic Specially Protected Area (ASPA) No.120. It was designated as such because it contains representative examples of terrestrial Antarctic ecosystems. Apart from the emperor penguin colony, the only one of about 30 in Antarctica that lies close to a permanent research station, birds nesting in the area include Adélie penguins, Antarctic skuas, Wilson's storm petrels, southern giant petrels, snow petrels and Cape petrels. Weddell seals also occur there.

== See also ==
- List of Antarctic and subantarctic islands
