= Cervin =

Cervin may refer to:

- Cervin (surname)
- Matterhorn or Mont Cervin, a mountain of the Alps
- Refuge Guides du Cervin, a refuge in the Alps
- Mount Cervin, a small rocky hill in Antarctica
