= Florence Island =

Florence Island is the name for a number of islands around the world, including:

- Florence Island (Antarctica), an island in Adélie Land, Antarctica
- Florence Island, an island in the Thousand Islands region, in Alexandria Bay, New York
- Florence Island (Washington), the diked river delta of the Stillaguamish River in Washington, United States
