= Gouverneur Island =

Island in Adélie Land, Antarctica

- Location within Antarctica

Geography
- Location: Antarctica
- Coordinates: 66°40′S 139°57′E

Administration
- Administered under the Antarctic Treaty System

Demographics
- Population: Uninhabited

Gouverneur Island is a low rocky island 2.2 kilometres (1.2 nmi) west-southwest of Petrel Island and 4.4 kilometres (2.4 nmi) east of Cape Géodésie in the southern part of the Géologie Archipelago, Antarctica. It was photographed from the air by Operation Highjump, 1946–47, and was charted and named by the French Antarctic Expedition under André F. Liotard, 1949–51. Liotard was the first man to encamp on the island and, as leader of the Expedition, also held the honorary post of governor.

== See also ==
- List of Antarctic and sub-Antarctic islands
