= Ifo Island =

Island in Adélie Land, Antarctica

- Location within Antarctica

Geography
- Location: Antarctica
- Coordinates: 66°38′S 139°44′E
- Archipelago: Géologie Archipelago

Administration
- Administered under the Antarctic Treaty System

Demographics
- Population: Uninhabited

Ifo Island is a low rocky island 370 m (0.2 nmi) southeast of Hélène Island at the western end of the Géologie Archipelago, Antarctica. It was photographed from the air by U.S. Navy Operation Highjump, 1946–47, and was charted and named by the French Antarctic Expedition, 1949–51, under André-Frank Liotard. "Ifo" is an approximate phonetic spelling of "il faut," a much-used expression by the French expression meaning "one (you) must."

== See also ==
- List of Antarctic and sub-Antarctic islands
