= Lion Island =

Lion Island may refer to:

== Places ==
- Lion Island (New South Wales), an island in Broken Bay north of Sydney, Australia
- Lion Island (Old Windsor), an uninhabited island in the River Thames, England
- Lion Island, Palmer Archipelago, Antarctica
- Lion Island, Géologie Archipelago, Antarctica
- Lion Island, Victoria Land, Antarctica
- Lion Island, Spain

== See also ==
- Shi Islet (獅嶼), or Lion Islet, Lieyu Township, Kinmen County (Quemoy), Fujian (Fukien), Republic of China (Taiwan)
- Pulau Ujong
