= La Molaire =

La Molaire (66°40′S 140°1′E) is a rocky hill, 24 metres (80 ft) high, on the west side of Rostand Island in the Géologie Archipelago, Antarctica. It was charted in 1951 by the French Antarctic Expedition, and named "La Molaire" (the molar) because of its appearance.
