= Florence Island (Antarctica) =

Island in Adélie Land, Antarctica

- Location within Antarctica

Geography
- Location: Antarctica
- Coordinates: 66°38′S 140°5′E

Administration
- Administered under the Antarctic Treaty System

Demographics
- Population: Uninhabited

Florence Island is a small rocky island lying 0.7 kilometres (0.4 nmi) south of Derby Island near the northern extremity of Astrolabe Glacier Tongue, Antarctica. it was charted by the French Antarctic Expedition in 1951 and named after Florence, Italy.

== See also ==
- List of Antarctic and sub-Antarctic islands
