= Mount Joli =

Mountain in Antarctica

Mount Joli (66°40′S 140°1′E) is a small rocky mass with three summits, the highest to 38 metres (125 ft), on the northeast side of Petrel Island in the Géologie Archipelago. It was charted in 1951 by the French Antarctic Expedition and named by them for a summit of the Alps in the vicinity of Mont Blanc.
