= Lion Island, Géologie Archipelago =

Island in Adélie Land, Antarctica

Lion Island
- Location within Antarctica

Geography
- Location: Antarctica
- Coordinates: 66°39′S 140°1′E
- Archipelago: Géologie Archipelago

Administration
- Administered under the Antarctic Treaty System

Demographics
- Population: Uninhabited

Lion Island is a small rocky island 0.4 kilometres (0.2 nmi) north-northeast of Petrel Island in the Géologie Archipelago. It was surveyed and named by the French Antarctic Expedition (1949–51) under André Liotard. The name derives from the rock summit of the island which has the shape of a lion's head.

== See also ==
- List of Antarctic and subantarctic islands
