= Derby Island =

Island in Adélie Land, Antarctica

- Location within Antarctica

Geography
- Location: Antarctica
- Coordinates: 66°38′S 140°5′E
- Archipelago: Dumoulin Islands

Administration
- Administered under the Antarctic Treaty System

Demographics
- Population: Uninhabited

Derby Island is a small rocky island close north of Astrolabe Glacier Tongue, lying 0.9 kilometres (0.5 nmi) southwest of Pasteur Island at the southern end of the Dumoulin Islands. It was photographed from the air by U.S. Navy Operation Highjump, 1946–47, charted by the French Antarctic Expedition, 1949–51, and so named because French field parties competed against each other for the honor of being first to reach the island area.

== See also ==
- List of Antarctic and sub-Antarctic islands
