= Cape Géodésie =

Cape Géodésie (66°40′24″S 139°50′16″E) is a low, ice-covered point marked by prominent rock outcrops at its northeast end, lying 3 nautical miles (6 km) northwest of the mouth of Astrolabe Glacier, Antarctica. It was photographed from the air by U.S. Navy Operation Highjump, 1946–47. It was charted by the French Antarctic Expedition, 1951–52, and so named by them because of the extensive geodetic program undertaken in this region, particularly in the Géologie Archipelago close offshore.
