= Mount Cervin =

Small rocky hill in Antarctica

Mount Cervin (66°40′S 140°1′E) is a small rocky hill, 30 metres (100 ft) high, on the east side of Petrel Island in the Géologie Archipelago. It was charted in 1951 by the French Antarctic Expedition and named by them for the Matterhorn ("Mont Cervin" in French), which it resembles in form.
