= Hélène Island =

Island in Adélie Land, Antarctica

- Location within Antarctica

Geography
- Location: Antarctica
- Coordinates: 66°37′S 139°44′E

Administration
- Administered under the Antarctic Treaty System

Demographics
- Population: Uninhabited

Hélène Island is a small rocky island 370 metres (0.2 nmi) northwest of Ifo Island marking the west end of the Géologie Archipelago in Antarctica. It was photographed from the air by U.S. Navy Operation Highjump, 1946–47, was charted by the French Antarctic Expedition, 1949–51, and named by them for one of the expedition's dogs.

== See also ==
- List of Antarctic and sub-Antarctic islands
