= Dumont d'Urville Station =

- Administrative centre and Antarctic base
- Base antarctique Dumont-d'Urville
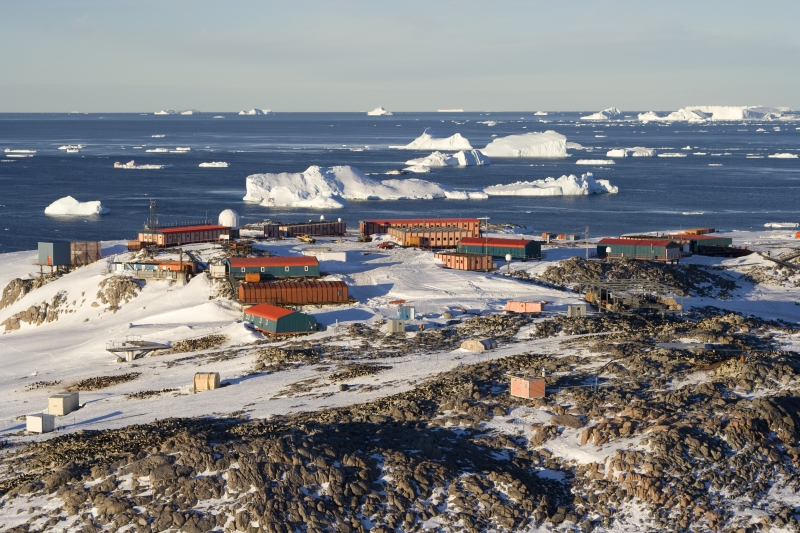
- Dumont d'Urville Station

- Flag

- Location of Dumont d'Urville Station in Antarctica
- Coordinates: 66°39′46″S 140°00′04″E
- Country: France
- Province: Archipelago of Pointe-Géologie
- Location in Antarctica: Adélie Land
- Administered by: French Polar Institute
- Established: 12 January 1956
- Named for: Jules Dumont d'Urville
- Elevation: 42 m (138 ft)
- UN/LOCODE: AQ DDU
- Type: All-year round
- Period: Annual
- Status: Operational
- Activities: List: Atmospheric chemistry; Geophysics; Ornithology; Zoology
- Website: www.institut-polaire.fr (in French)

D10 Skiway
- IATA: none; ICAO: AT04

Summary
- Airport type: Private
- Location: Dumont d'Urville Station
- Elevation AMSL: 662 ft (202 m)
- Coordinates: 66°42′01″S 139°49′41″E

Map
- Location of airfield in Antarctica

Runways
Direction	Length		Surface
Direction	ft	m	Surface
10/28	317	97	Ice

The Dumont d'Urville Station (French: Base antarctique Dumont-d'Urville) is a French scientific station in Antarctica on Île des Pétrels, archipelago of Pointe-Géologie in Adélie Land. It is named after explorer Jules Dumont d'Urville, whose expedition landed on Débarquement Rock in the Dumoulin Islands at the northeast end of the archipelago on 21 January 1840. It is operated by the "French Polar Institute Paul-Émile Victor", a joint operation of French public and para-public agencies. It is the administrative centre of Adélie Land.

== History ==
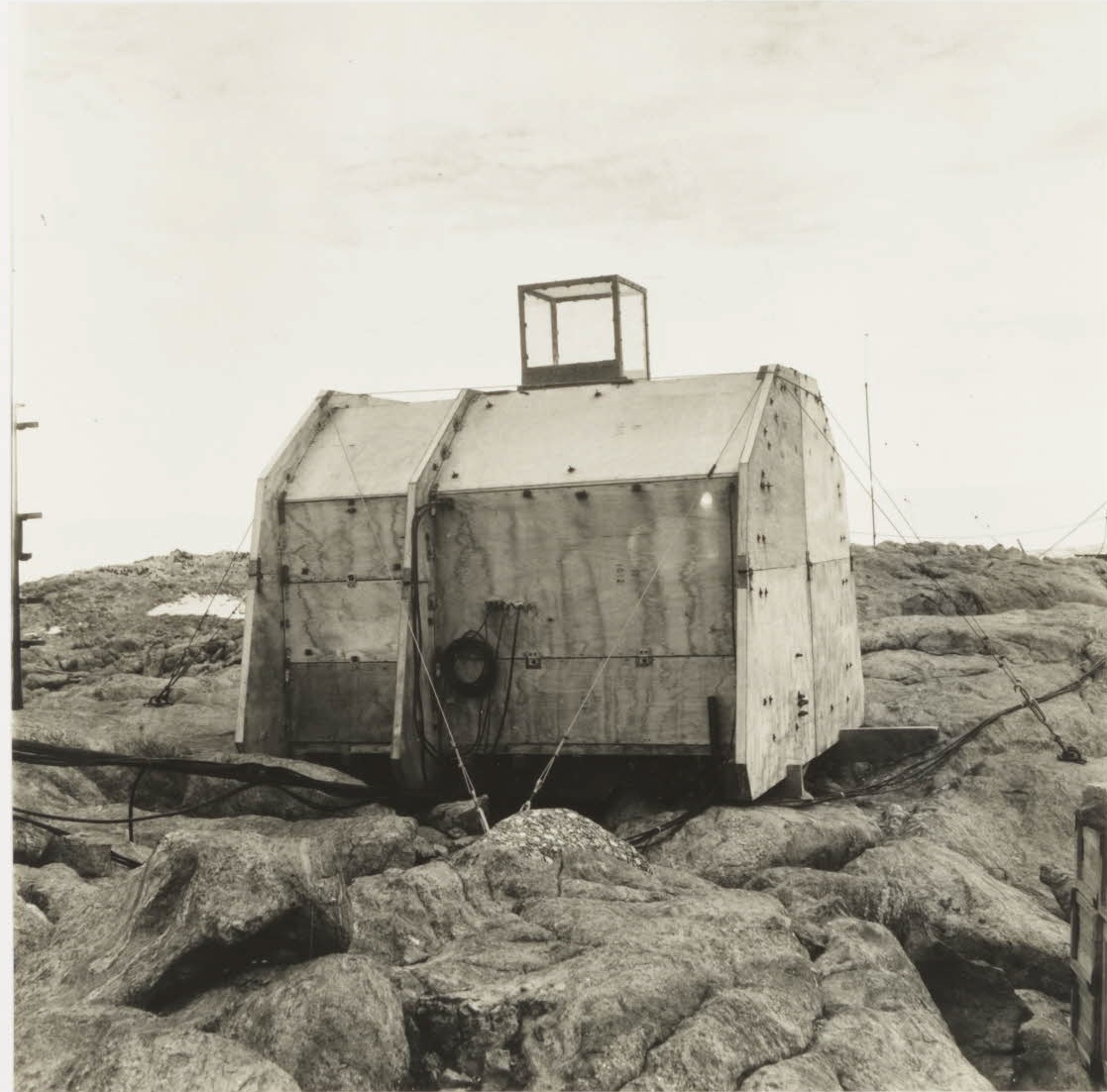
A station in 1959, Archives Nationales

A pioneering French Antarctic research station, Port Martin, located 62 kilometres (39 mi) east of D'Urville, was destroyed by fire on the night of 23 January 1952, without death or injury. In 1952, a small base was built on Île des Pétrels to study a rookery of emperor penguins. This base was called Base Marret. As the main base Port Martin was a total loss, Base Marret was chosen as overwintering site for 1952/1953. The new main base, Dumont D'Urville station, was built on the same island and opened on 12 January 1956, to serve as the centre for French scientific research during the Antarctic International Geophysical Year 1957/1958. The station has remained in active use ever since.

The station allows 30-40 people to come ashore at one time. Ice and strong katabatic winds often prevent landings, either by boat or by helicopter. The station can accommodate about 30 winter-overs and 90 during the summer. The icebreaker ship L'Astrolabe carries supplies and personnel to the station from the port of Hobart, Tasmania. It does 5 round-trips between November and March.

The Academy Award-winning documentary film La Marche de l'empereur, released in English as March of the Penguins, was filmed in the region around this base.

== Wildlife ==
One of the main interests of the base is the study of wildlife, notably the emperor penguins. In the summer, the rocks near the base serve as a refuge for the Adélie penguin, which comes here to reproduce. Skua, snow petrel, giant petrel, Cape petrel also spend the summer near the base. In the winter, only emperor penguins stay to reproduce. However, around August, giant petrels return to feed on emperor penguin chicks.

Some marine animals are equally present despite the negative temperature of the water. Among rare visitors to the archipelago, there are other species of penguins, orcas, and rorquals.

== Activity ==
The base Dumont d'Urville is first and foremost a scientific base, even if nowadays the transportation of supplies to the Concordia Station (operated together with Italian researchers) represents an important part of the activity of the base. The French Southern and Atlantic Lands (TAAF) administration, the French Polar Institute Paul-Émile Victor (IPEV) and the French Navy jointly operate the icebreaker L'Astrolabe which is based out of Réunion. The vessel is used both to bring personnel and supplies to the Dumont d'Urville Station and for research and patrol duties.

=== Chemistry of the atmosphere ===
The laboratory in atmospheric chemistry of the base is used to analyse, among other things, sulfur compounds present in the atmosphere.

=== Geophysics ===
Nowadays, the study of geophysics is less present in the base. Nonetheless, several tools are still in use, notably a tide gauge, a cosmic rays detector, a GPS to measure the dip of the Antarctica into the upper mantle, and a lidar, which allows the analysis of the ozone depletion and the ozone holes.

=== Logistics ===
The proper functioning of the base and supplying Concordia requires significant logistics, especially in the summer. Technicians, including electricians, plumbers, mechanics for the electric plant and auto mechanics are essential for the proper functioning of the base all year round.

In the 1950s the station had a small narrow-gauge railway for transporting supplies from a landing jetty to the main base. This was the only recorded railway ever in Antarctica.

== Climate ==
Dumont d'Urville Station has an ice cap (EF) climate with conditions milder than inland. This station experienced record warm temperatures and precipitation due to an unprecedented atmospheric river event in March 2022. Due to its mild ice cap climate, with summer temperatures often rising above freezing, some animal life, and a few plant species (moss and lichen) can grow in this location.

Climate data for Dumont d'Urville Station (extremes 1950–present)
Month	Jan	Feb	Mar	Apr	May	Jun	Jul	Aug	Sep	Oct	Nov	Dec	Year
Record high °C (°F)	9.7 (49.5)	6.4 (43.5)	4.9 (40.8)	8.7 (47.7)	0.0 (32.0)	0.9 (33.6)	0.5 (32.9)	0.3 (32.5)	0.3 (32.5)	1.7 (35.1)	4.7 (40.5)	11.0 (51.8)	11.0 (51.8)
Mean daily maximum °C (°F)	1.0 (33.8)	−2.1 (28.2)	−6.4 (20.5)	−10.0 (14.0)	−12.6 (9.3)	−14.6 (5.7)	−14.0 (6.8)	−14.5 (5.9)	−13.6 (7.5)	−10.3 (13.5)	−4.1 (24.6)	0.4 (32.7)	−8.4 (16.9)
Daily mean °C (°F)	−1.3 (29.7)	−4.5 (23.9)	−8.8 (16.2)	−12.4 (9.7)	−15.2 (4.6)	−17.3 (0.9)	−17.0 (1.4)	−17.4 (0.7)	−16.2 (2.8)	−13.2 (8.2)	−7.1 (19.2)	−2.2 (28.0)	−11.1 (12.0)
Mean daily minimum °C (°F)	−3.6 (25.5)	−6.9 (19.6)	−11.3 (11.7)	−14.8 (5.4)	−17.7 (0.1)	−20.0 (−4.0)	−20.0 (−4.0)	−20.3 (−4.5)	−18.8 (−1.8)	−16.1 (3.0)	−10.3 (13.5)	−4.7 (23.5)	−13.7 (7.3)
Record low °C (°F)	−10.8 (12.6)	−17.3 (0.9)	−25.0 (−13.0)	−26.1 (−15.0)	−32.5 (−26.5)	−34.9 (−30.8)	−34.4 (−29.9)	−37.4 (−35.3)	−36.1 (−33.0)	−37.2 (−35.0)	−21.0 (−5.8)	−14.0 (6.8)	−37.4 (−35.3)
Average precipitation days (≥ 0.1 mm)	9	7	10	8	10	7	11	11	10	8	6	6	103
Average relative humidity (%)	67	63	65	66	65	61	65	66	63	56	54	63	63
Mean monthly sunshine hours	282.1	206.2	155.0	105.0	40.3	12.0	15.5	68.2	150.0	251.1	315.0	359.6	1,960
Mean daily sunshine hours	9.1	7.3	5.0	3.5	1.3	0.4	0.5	2.2	5.0	8.1	10.5	11.6	5.4
Source 1: Deutscher Wetterdienst
Source 2: Meteo Climat (record highs and lows)

== Gallery ==
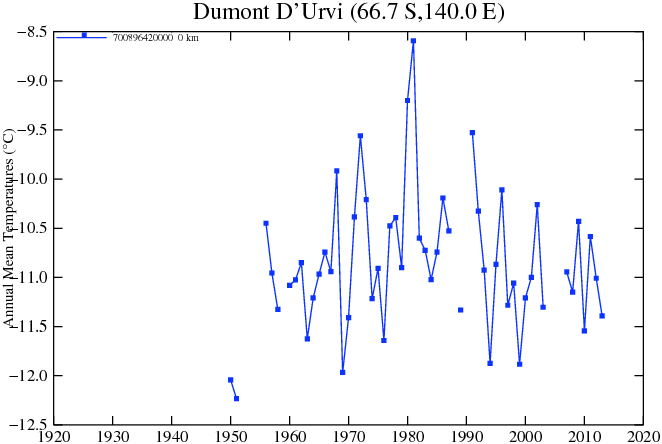
Climate graph of 1950-2012 air average temperatures at D'Urville Station

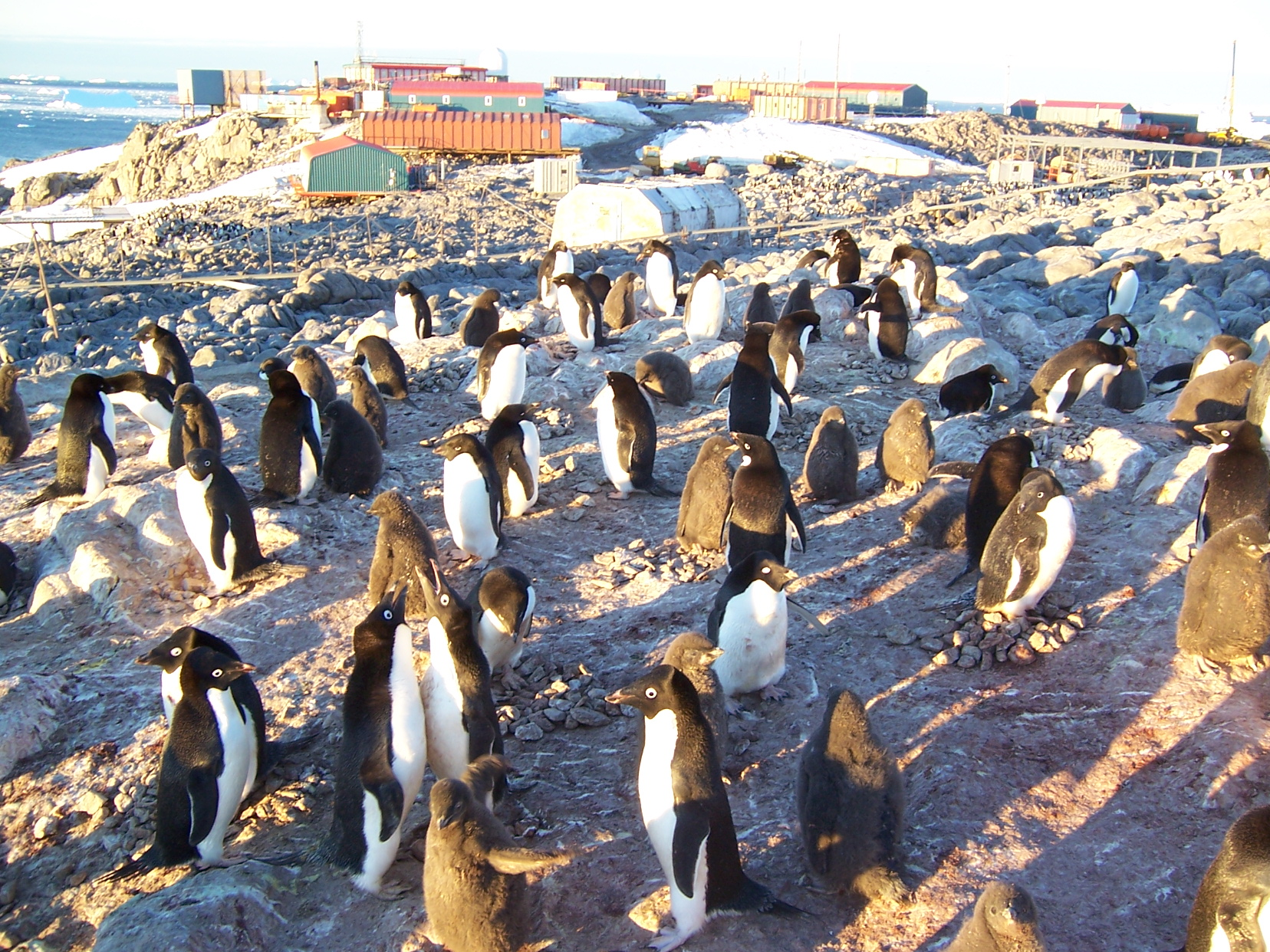
A colony of Adélie penguins

Panorama of the Dumont d'Urville Station in 2005

== See also ==
- List of Antarctic research stations
- List of Antarctic field camps
- List of airports in Antarctica
- Concordia Station
