= Refuge Guides du Cervin =

Coordinates: 45°56′08″N 7°42′26″E

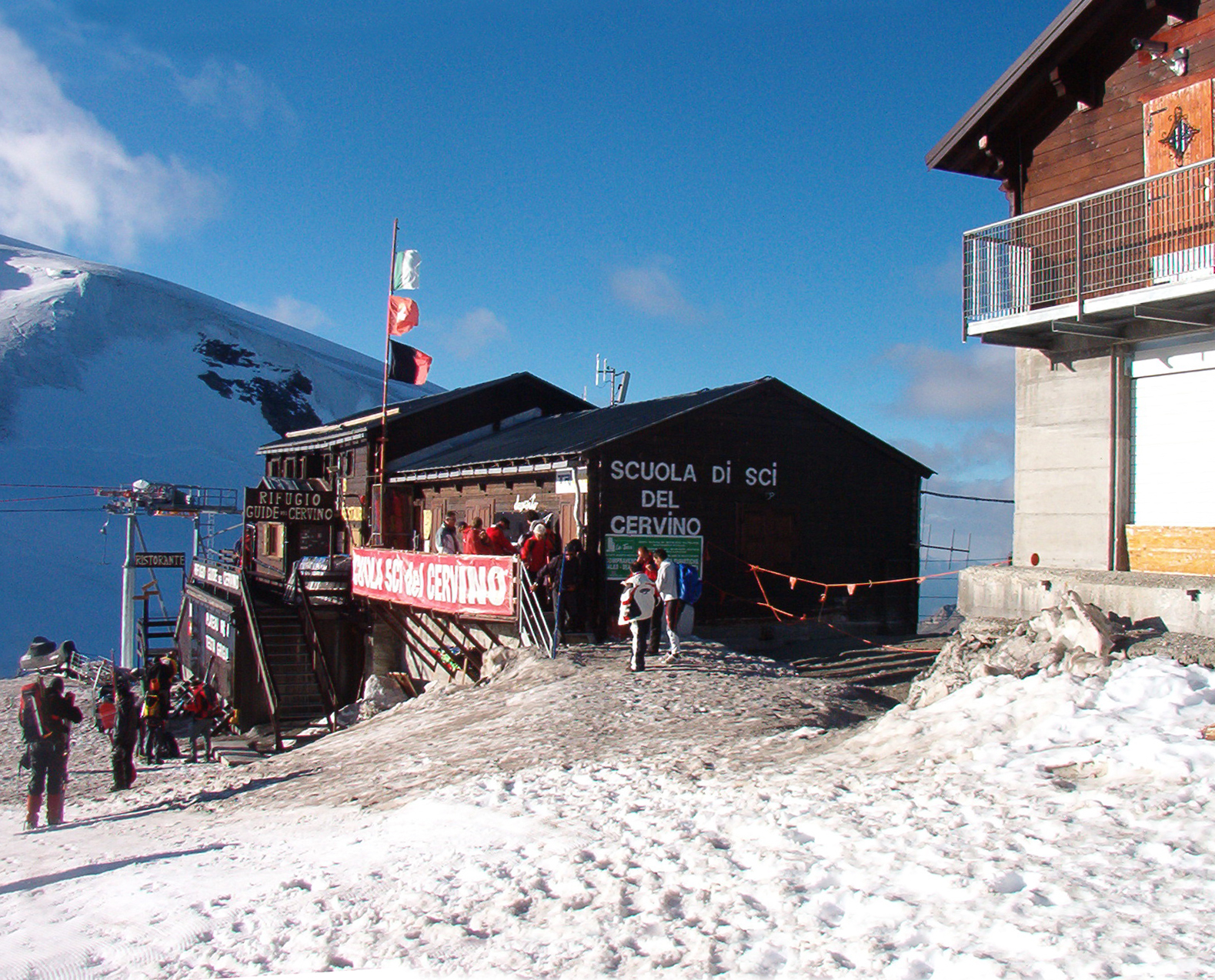
Rifugio Guide del Cervino of the italian Société des guides du Cervin built on the Swiss–Italian border. Valtournenche - Aosta Valley - Italy / Zermatt - Valais - Switzerland

Refuge Guide del Cervino is a refuge in the Alps in Aosta Valley, Italy. It stands at 3,480m on the minor peak Testa Grigia. It has an indoor toilet and limited running water. It is linked by cablecar to the Klein Matterhorn station (3883m).

== Characteristics ==
Inaugurated in 1984, it is located on the border between Italy and Switzerland, between the summit of Tête Grise and the Aventine Pass, at the edge of the Rosa Plateau. In this area, the border is defined by the watershed line, which here is marked by the crests of the Théodule and Valtournenche glaciers. With the melting of the glacier due to climate change, the border had to be redrawn in 2022 and was shifted several dozen meters to the west, now passing through the refuge, which is thus mostly located in Switzerland. Negotiations between the two countries were initiated to resolve this new border dispute. This situation is similar to that of the Queen Margaret Hut located on Monte Rosa.

== How to get here ==
By car - Châtillon-Saint-Vincent motorway exit.

By public transport - the nearest train station is in Châtillon.

Ski mountaineering - ascend the slopes leading to Plan Maison, continue towards Cime Bianche Laghi, then to the Plateau Rosa.
