= Débarquement Rock =

Ice free rock off the Adélie Land coast, Antarctica

Coordinates: 66°36′19″S 140°3′50″E

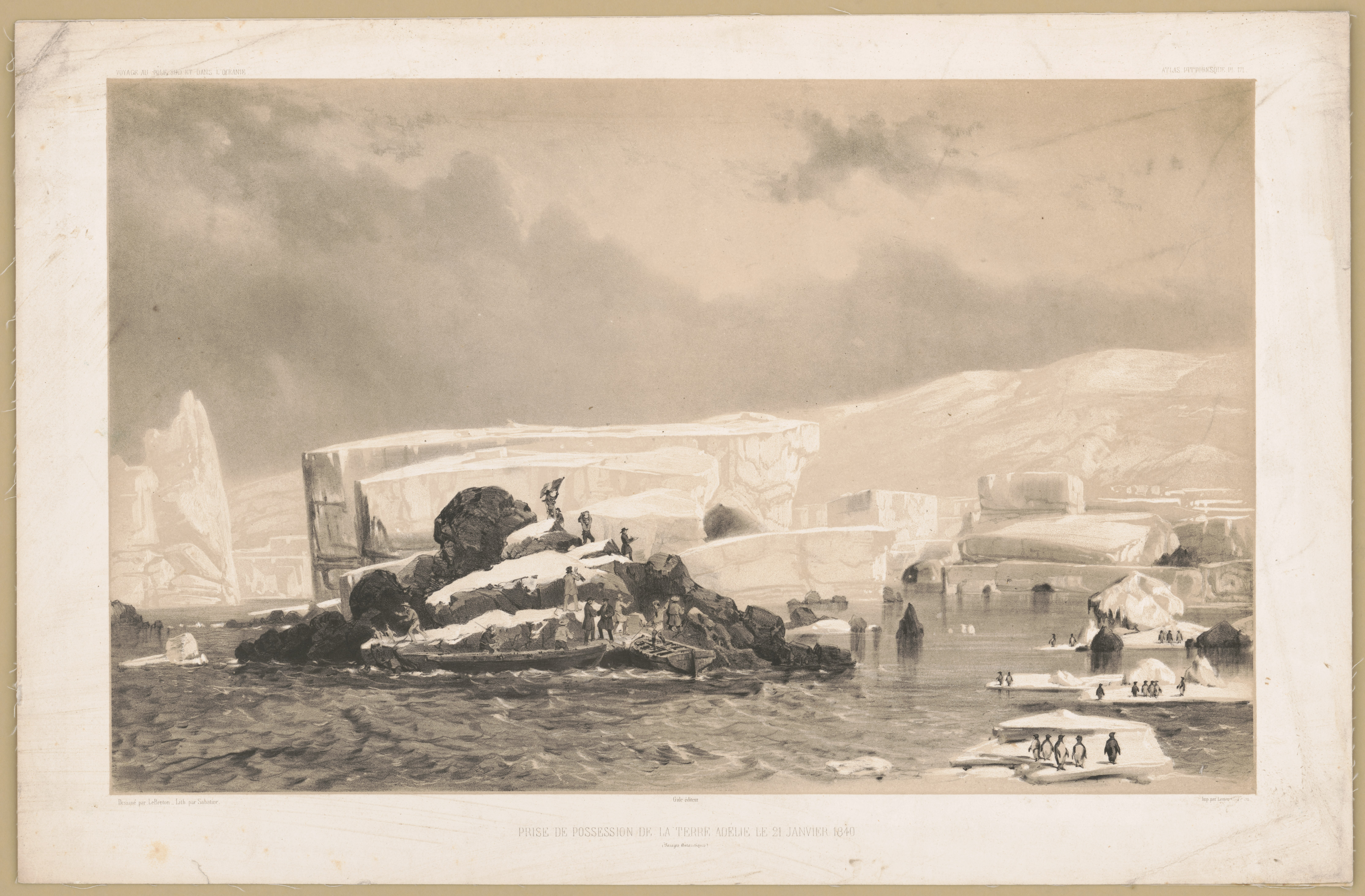
Taking of possession of the Terre Adélie on 22 January 1840 on the Rocher du Débarquement, drawing by Louis Le Breton.

Débarquement Rock is an ice-free rock 200 metres (220 yd) long and 18.7 m high, marking the northern end of the Dumoulin Islands and the north-eastern end of the Géologie Archipelago.

== History ==
The French Antarctic Expedition, 1837–40, under Captain Jules Dumont d'Urville landed on the western side of the highest of the westernmost rocky islets, to which he gave the name "Rocher du Débarquement". The landing was described by him as taking place on 21 January 1840 at 9 in the evening, though the actual date was 22 January 1840, since d'Urville had forgotten to add a day on his diary when he passed the 180° meridian from the east.

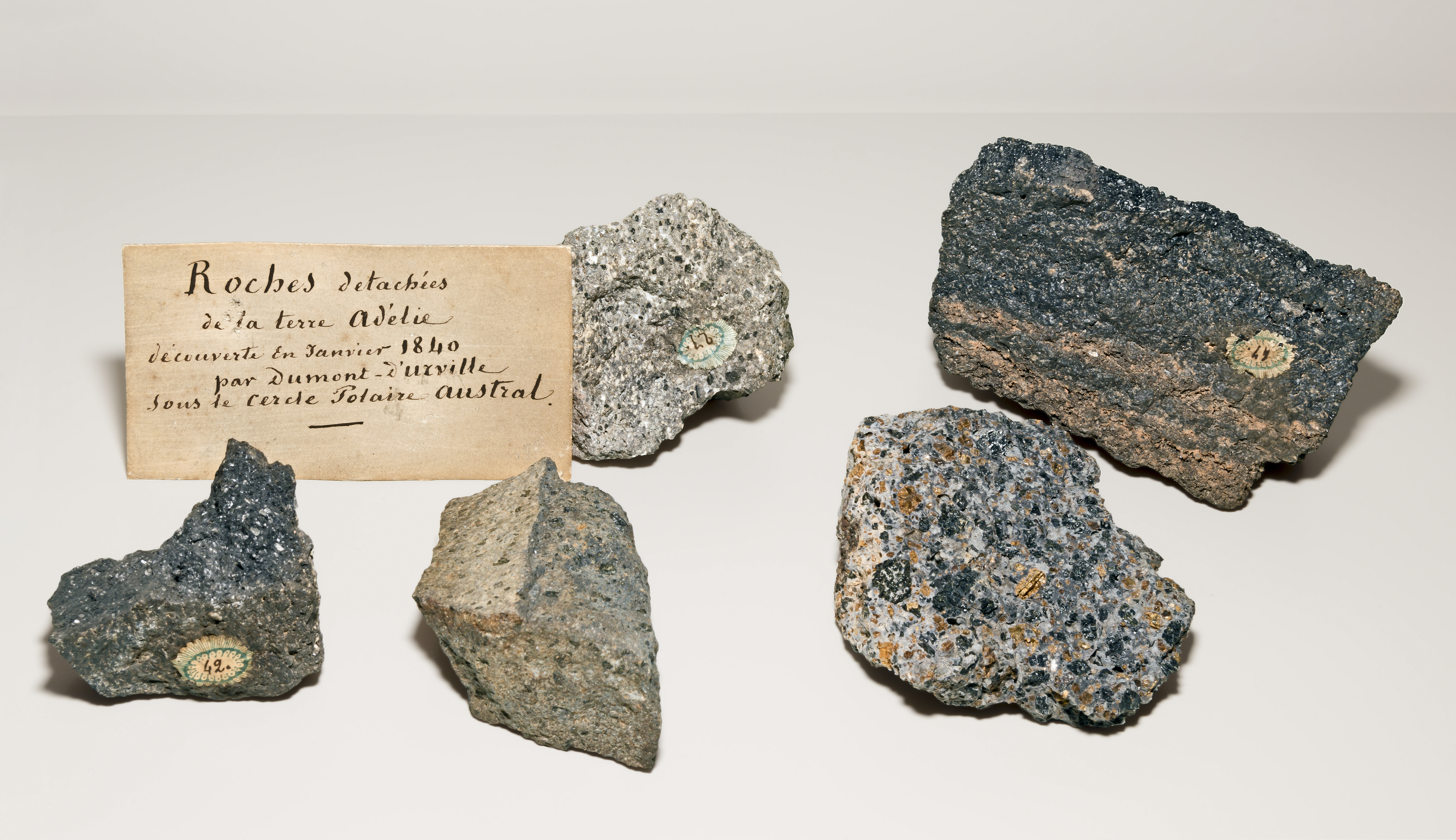
Samples of rocks of the Débarquement Rock, from the expedition of 1840, Muséum de Toulouse.

Identification of the islet with d'Urville's "Rocher du Débarquement" has been made on the basis of aerial photographs taken in the course of the US Navy's Operation Highjump (1946–1947), and of surveys and geological studies made by the French Antarctic Expedition in 1950–1952, with the seaward position of Débarquement Rock correlating with the feature named by d'Urville. Analysis of the geological samples brought back by the expedition indicates that the landing took place on one of the Dumoulin Islands (named by d'Urville in honour of the expedition hydrographer Clément Adrien Vincendon-Dumoulin), and the islet is, as described by d'Urville, the north-westernmost and highest of the group, similar in appearance from the west to that portrayed in illustrations contemporary with the original landing.

The islet was designated a historic site (HSM 81) following a proposal by France to the Antarctic Treaty Consultative Meeting.
