= Port Martin =

Port Martin Port-Martin
- Antarctic research station
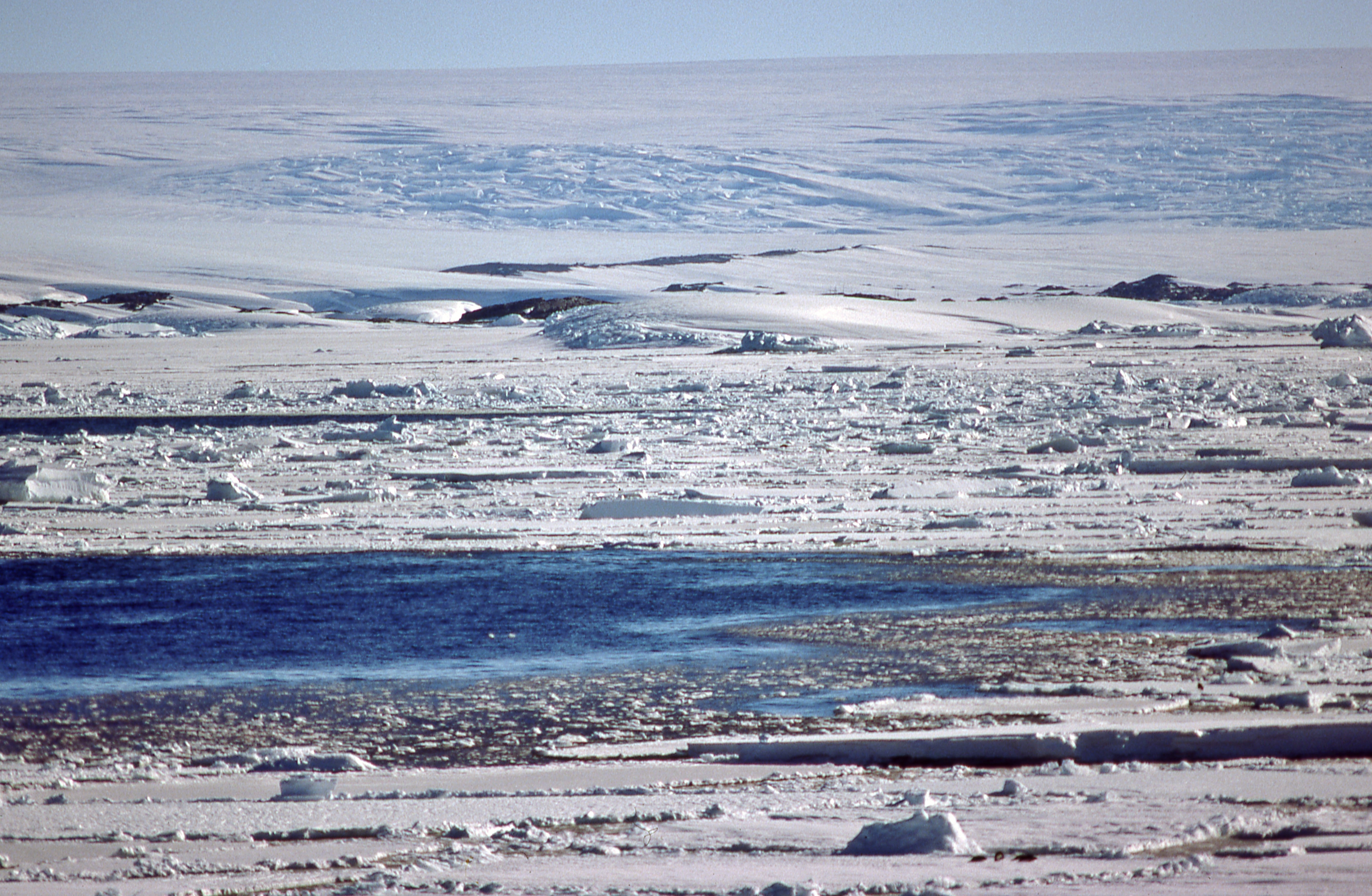
- Antarctic coastline near the station

- Location in Antarctica
- Coordinates: 66°49′10″S 141°23′30″E
- Region: Adélie Land
- Location: Cape Margerie
- Established: 20 January 1950
- Destroyed: 23 January 1952
- Named for: André-Paul Martin

Government
  - Type: Administration
  - Body: French Antarctic Expedition
- Active times: All year-round

Port Martin, or Port-Martin, is an abandoned French research base at Cape Margerie on the coast of Adélie Land, Antarctica, as well as the name of the adjacent anchorage.

== History ==
The site was discovered in 1950 by the Fifth French Antarctic Expedition under André-Frank Liotard and a landing made on 18 January 1950. The base was established by Liotard and a team of 11 men who raised the main building with several annexes to house scientific activities. It was named for expeditioner André Paul Martin (aka J. A. Martin), originally second-in-command of the group, who had died of a stroke off South Africa as the expedition was en route to the Antarctic.

On 6 January 1951 the base team was relieved by 17-member team under the leadership of Michel Barré. Over the following year they enlarged the main building while continuing the research program. They, in turn, were relieved on 4 January 1952 while a smaller team of seven, led by Mario Marret, built a secondary base on Petrel Island, some 60 kilometres (37 mi) to the west in the Géologie Archipelago.

On the night of 23–24 January 1952 the Port Martin base was largely destroyed by a fire which burnt down its main building. There were no deaths nor injuries incurred but the base personnel were evacuated to Petrel Island, where they overwintered, and Port Martin abandoned.

=== Historic site ===
Since 1952 the site has remained largely undisturbed. What remains in Port-Martin are the base's ancillary buildings, including a weather shelter and its coal and supply sheds, beneath a covering of snow. It represents an optimal site to design archaeological methods and techniques in extreme climatic conditions. It is considered a valuable archaeological as well as a historic site and is protected under the Antarctic Treaty System as Antarctic Specially Protected Area (ASPA) No.166. It has also been designated a Historic Site or Monument (HSM 46), following a proposal by France to the Antarctic Treaty Consultative Meeting.

== See also ==
- List of Antarctic research stations
- List of Antarctic field camps
