= Dumoulin Islands =

Group of islands in Adélie Land, Antarctica

- Location within Antarctica

Geography
- Location: Antarctica
- Coordinates: 66°37′S 140°4′E

Administration
- Administered under the Antarctic Treaty System

Demographics
- Population: Uninhabited

The Dumoulin Islands are a small group of rocky islands in the Antarctic region at the northeast end of the Géologie Archipelago, 4.6 kilometres (2.5 nmi) north of Astrolabe Glacier Tongue. On 22 January 1840, a French Antarctic expedition led by Captain Jules Dumont d'Urville, aboard his flagship Astrolabe, landed a party on one of these islands, Rocher du Débarquement. Dumont d'Urville named the group of islands in honor of the hydrographer of his expedition, Clément Adrien Vincendon-Dumoulin.

The islands were roughly charted by the Australasian Antarctic Expedition, 1911–14, under Douglas Mawson. The island group was photographed from the air by U.S. Navy Operation Highjump, 1946–47, and recharted by a French Antarctic Expedition under André-Frank Liotard, 1949–51.

== See also ==
- List of Antarctic and subantarctic islands
