= Cervin (surname) =

Cervin is the surname of Swedish or Romance origin. Notable people with this surname include:

- Andreas Cervin (1888–1972), Swedish gymnast
- Anna Cervin (1878–1972), Swedish artist
- Caesar Cervin (born 1953), American association football forward
- Ernesto Rubin de Cervin (1936–2013), Italian composer and teacher
- Tore Cervin (born 1950), Swedish association football player
