= Adélie Land =

Territory in Antarctica claimed by France

Adélie Land Terre Adélie (French)
- Flag of the French Southern and Antarctic Lands Coat of arms
- Motto: "Liberté, égalité, fraternité" (French) (English: "Liberty, equality, fraternity")
- Anthem: La Marseillaise ("The Marseillaise")
- Status: District of French Southern and Antarctic Lands
- Capital and largest city: Dumont d'Urville Station
- Official languages: French
- Demonym: French

Government
  - President: Emmanuel Macron
  - Administrator: Mikael Quimbert
  - Head of District: Nicolas Puvis

French overseas territory
  - Discovered and claimed by France: 20 January 1840
  - Administered from French Madagascar: 1924
  - Administered as a district of the French Southern and Antarctic Lands: 1955

Area
  - Total: 432,000 km^{2} (167,000 sq mi)

Population
  - Estimate: c. 33 (winter) < 80 (summer)
- Currency: Euro (EUR)
- Time zone: UTC+10
- Calling code: +262 262 00 2
- Internet TLD: .aq; .tf; .fr

Adélie Land (French: Terre Adélie [tɛʁ adeli]) or Adélie Coast is a claimed territory of France located on the continent of Antarctica, making France one out of seven sovereign states making territorial claims in Antarctica. It stretches from a portion of the Southern Ocean coastline all the way inland to the South Pole. France has administered it as one of five districts of the French Southern and Antarctic Lands since 1955 and applied the Antarctic Treaty System rules since 1961. Article 4 of the Antarctic Treaty deals with territorial claims, and although it does not renounce or diminish any preexisting claims to sovereignty, it also does not prejudice the position of contracting parties in their recognition or non-recognition of territorial sovereignty. France has had a permanent station in Adélie Land since 9 April 1950.

== Geography ==
Adélie Land lies between 136° E (near Pourquoi Pas Point at 66°12′S 136°11′E) and 142° E (near Point Alden at 66°48′S 142°02′E), with a shore length of about 350 kilometres (220 mi) and with its inland part extending as a sector of a circle about 2,600 kilometres (1,600 mi) toward the South Pole. Adélie Land has borders with the Australian Antarctic Territory both on the east and on the west, namely on Clarie Land (part of Wilkes Land) in the west, and George V Land in the east. Additionally, it is the only territory claimed within French Southern and Antarctic Lands that is not an island.

Its total land area, mostly covered with glaciers, is estimated to be 432,000 square kilometres (167,000 sq mi).

The coast of Adélie Land is known for its katabatic winds which push snow and sea ice away from the coast. In a 1915 Science Magazine volume, it was named the "stormiest spot on the face of earth".

== History ==
The coast of Adélie Land was discovered in January 1840 by the French explorer Jules Dumont d'Urville (1790–1842) who named it after his wife, Adèle. This is the basis of the French claim to this Antarctic land. The first French research station, Port Martin, was built in 1950. It was destroyed by a fire in 1952, and replaced by Dumont d'Urville Station in 1956. Charcot Station was a French inland base built which was occupied from 1957 to 1960.

Cap Prud'Homme Camp, an Italian-French base, opened in 1994. Prud'Homme and Dumont d'Urville are the only currently remaining active stations.

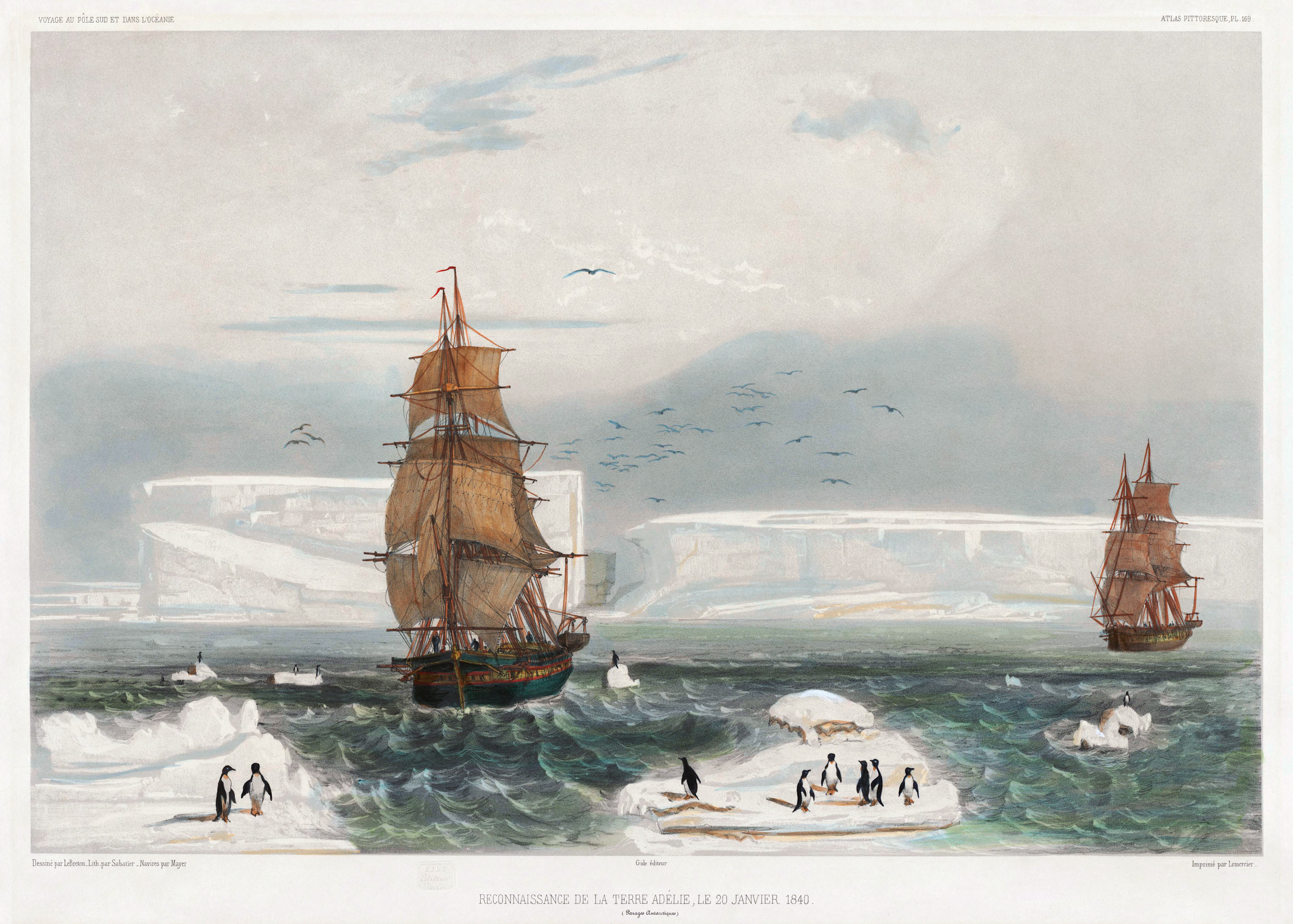
Discovery by Jules Dumont d'Urville, 1840

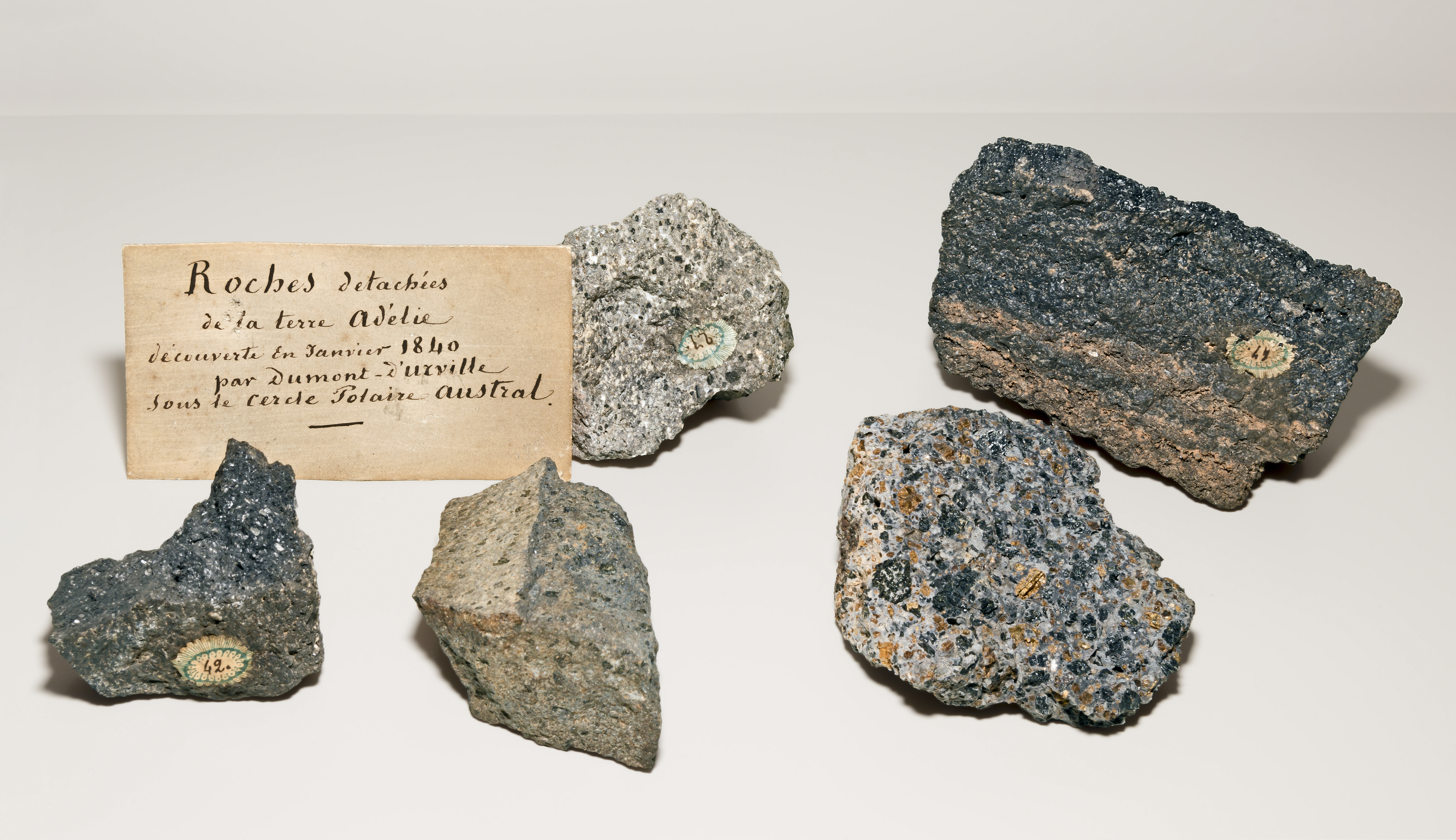
Rocks brought back by the expedition in January 1840

== Research stations ==
=== Port Martin and Base Marret (1950–1952) ===
The site of Port Martin was discovered during a French Antarctic Expedition under André-Frank Liotard on 18 January 1950. Liotard, along with 11 men, established the station on 9 April 1950 at 66°49′04″S 141°23′39″E. Port Martin housed a winter population of 11 in 1950–51 and 17 in 1951–52. A crew under Mario Marret built a temporary secondary base in January 1952: Base Marret on Petrel Island.

Port Martin was destroyed by a fire during the night of 23–24 January 1952. All of the inhabitants were safely evacuated, and they overwintered at Base Marret. Only the ancillary buildings of Port Martin were not destroyed by the fire and they have remained mostly untouched since.

=== Dumont d'Urville Station (1956–present) ===
The Dumont d'Urville Station is a year-round French research base located at 66°40′S 140°01′E. The station is 4,815 square metres (51,830 sq ft) large and houses a summer population of 120 and a winter population of around 30. It was built on 12 January 1956 for the International Geophysical Year of 1957–58. Initially intended to be a temporary station, it was expanded and continually occupied. Like Base Marret, the station is located on Petrel Island, which is 5 kilometres (3.1 mi) from the mainland. The station's research includes ecology, marine biology, glaciology, meteorology and more. In the documentary, March of the Penguins (2005), Dumont d'Urville Station was the main filming location.

=== Charcot Station (1957–1960) ===
Charcot Station was a French inland base located on the Antarctic ice sheet at 320 kilometres (200 mi) from the coast and from Dumont d'Urville Station, at an elevation of about 2,400 metres (7,900 ft). The station, built for the International Geophysical Year of 1957–58, paid homage to Jean-Baptiste Charcot), and was occupied from January 1957 through 1960 housing solely three men. The base was composed of a main body of 24 square metres (260 sq ft) (the "barrack") which consisted of semi-cylindrical sections of sheet metal assembled end to end. This form was planned to best withstand the snow pressure accumulated on it. Horizontal galleries were connected to house scientific measurement devices, while a vertical air conduit opened a few metres above the snow level provided ventilation.

=== Robert Guillard Station (1994–present) ===
Robert Guillard Station known as Cap Prud'Homme (66°41′28″S 139°53′44″E) is an Italian-French camp, opened in 1994, located on the coast of the Antarctic ice sheet, in Adélie Land, about five km (3.1 mi) from Petrel Island, where the French Dumont d'Urville Station is. All the supplies and equipment for the Italian-French Concordia Station are transported by a combined convoy of up to seven Caterpillar tractors from Cap Prud'Homme, with Kässbohrer trailblazers and a team of up to nine people; each convoy transports an average of 150 tons of payload.

== Wildlife ==
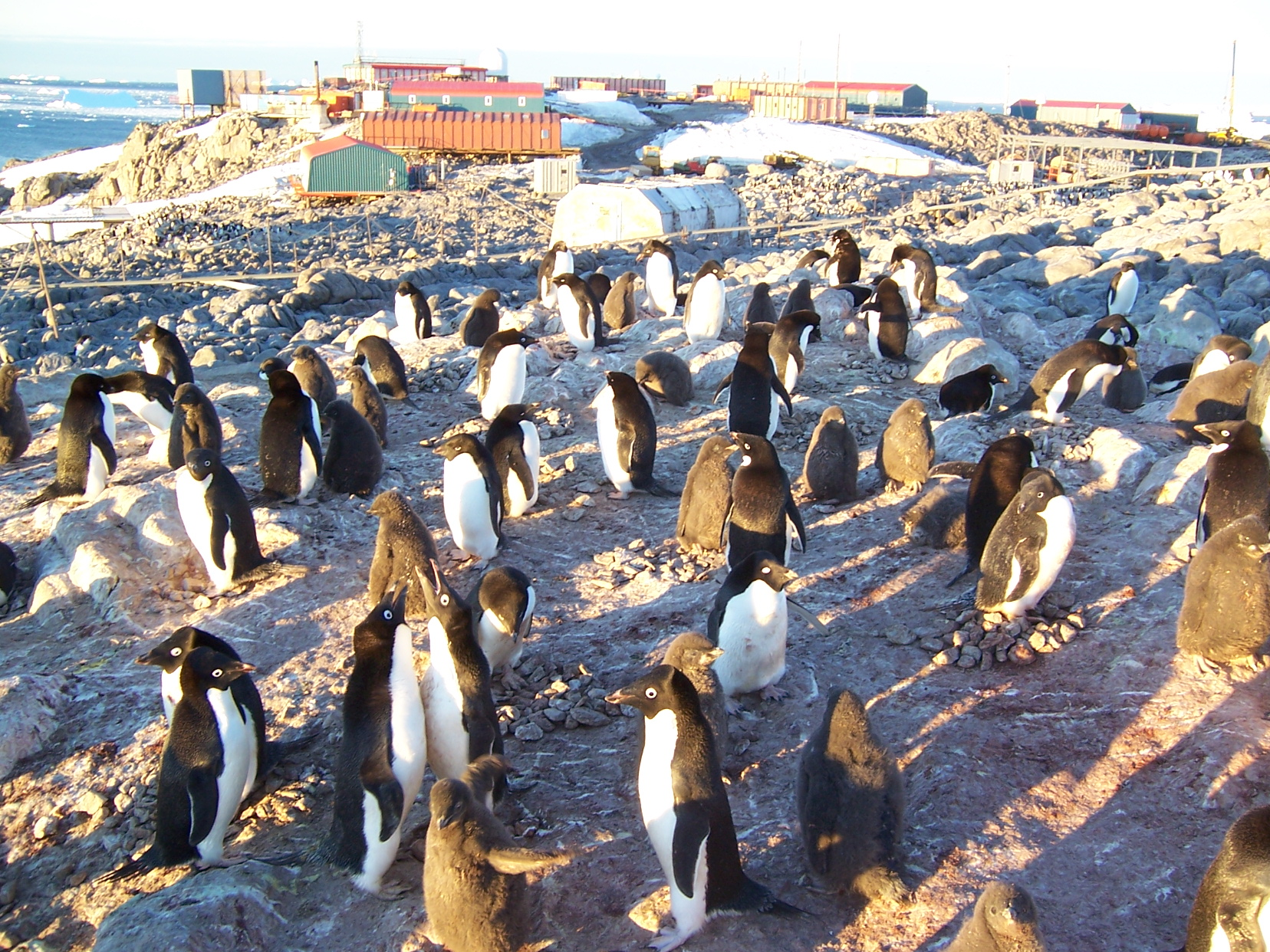
Colony of Adélie penguins near the Dumont d'Urville Station

Part of the Pointe Géologie Archipelago in Adélie Land is protected by the Antarctic Specially Protected Area 120. In 2016, a study predicted that an Adélie penguin colony located in Cape Dennison in Commonwealth Bay might be subject to extinction. In 2010, a fallen glacier blocked the flow of a river and caused sea ice to overflow to the rocky surface that Adélie penguins require to nest.

Before 2017, an estimated 18,000 pairs of Adélie penguin resided in the Adélie Land. However, in 2017, an insurgence of sea ice forced the penguins to travel further to reach the sea. Due to this, nearly all of the newborn penguins had died of starvation and exhaustion. The Dumont d'Urville Station is in proximity to Adélie penguins, emperor penguins, and seals.

== See also ==
- Adelie Land Meteorite
- Adélie Valley
- Research stations in Antarctica
- Antarctic field camps
