= Astrolabe Glacier =

Glacier in Antarctica

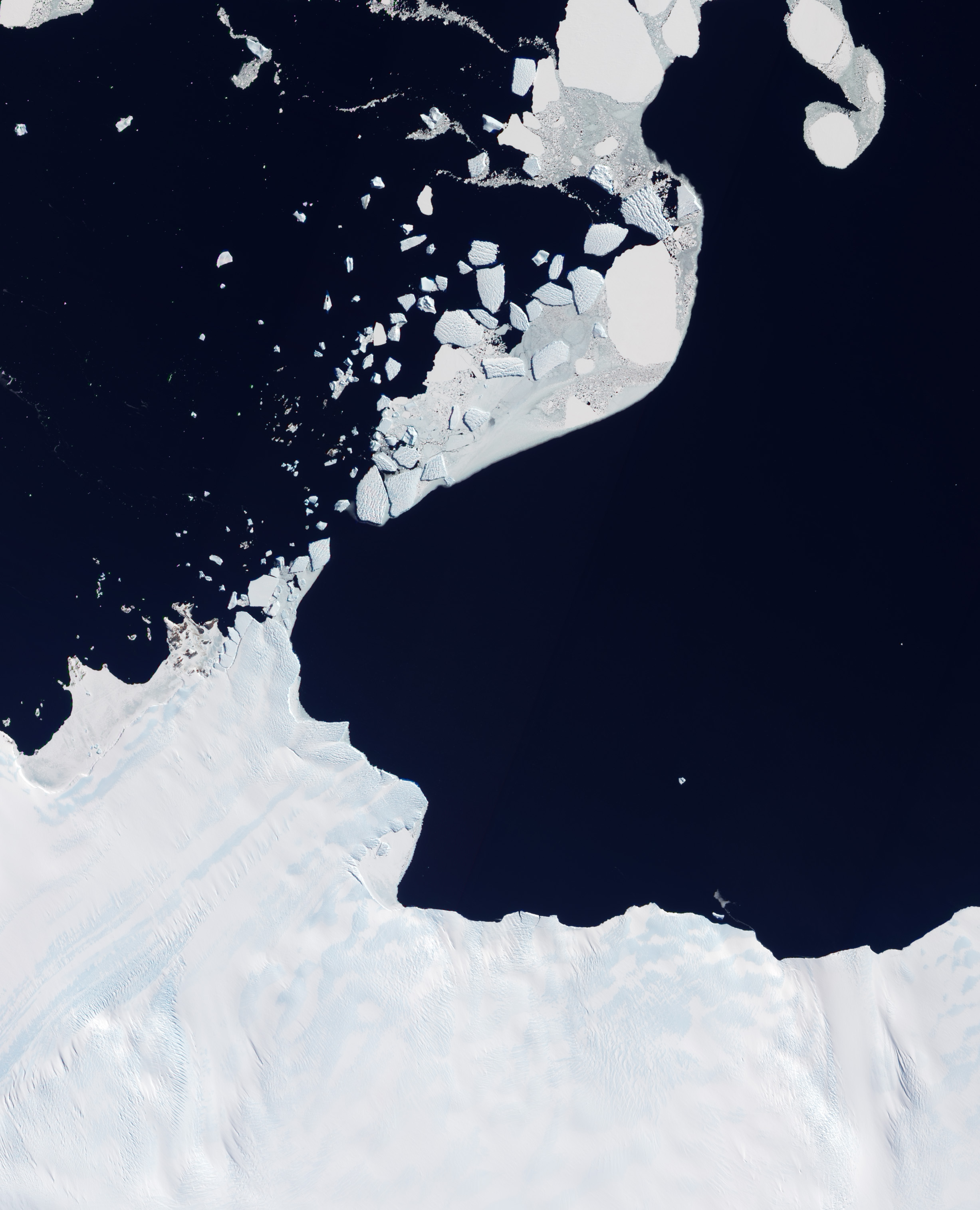
- Natural-colour satellite image of Astrolabe

- Location within Antarctica
- Type: unknown
- Location: Adélie Land
- Coordinates: 66°45′S 139°55′E
- Area: 96 km^{2} (37 sq mi)
- Length: 19 km (12 mi)
- Width: 7 km (4.3 mi)
- Thickness: unknown
- Terminus: Southern Ocean
- Status: unknown

Astrolabe Glacier is a glacier 10 kilometres (10 km) wide and 19 kilometres (10 nmi) long, flowing north-northeast from the continental ice and terminating at the coast in a prominent tongue at the east side of Géologie Archipelago.

== History ==
It was first sighted in 1840 by the French expedition under Captain Jules Dumont d'Urville, although no glaciers were noted on d'Urville's chart of this coast but a formidable icy dike with perpendicular flanks of 37.7 m high according to the joined plate, corresponding to the glacier tongue. The glacier was photographed from the air by U.S. Navy Operation Highjump in January 1947. It was charted by the French Antarctic Expedition, 1949–51, and named after d'Urville's flagship, the Astrolabe.

== Glacier Tongue ==
The Astrolabe Glacier Tongue (66°42′S 140°5′E) is a prominent glacier tongue about 6 kilometres (3 nmi) wide and 7 kilometres (4 nmi) long, extending northeast from Astrolabe Glacier.

Located in the Terre Adélie-George V Land section of East Antarctica, Astrolabe Glacier streams out from the interior of Antarctica to dump ice into the sea.

== See also ==
- List of glaciers in the Antarctic
- Glaciology
