= Petrel Island (Antarctica) =

Island in Adélie Land, Antarctica

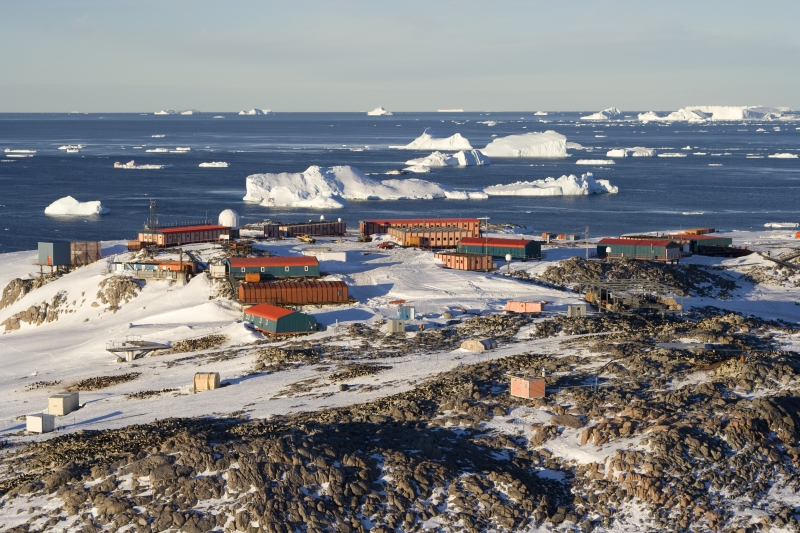
- Dumont d'Urville Station on Petrel Island

- Location within Antarctica

Geography
- Location: Antarctica
- Coordinates: 66°40′S 140°1′E
- Archipelago: Géologie Archipelago
- Major islands: Petrel Island, Gouverneur Island, Alexis Carel Island, Jean Rostand Island
- Area: 0.33 km^{2} (0.13 sq mi)
- Length: 900 m (3000 ft)
- Highest elevation: 44 m (144 ft)
- Highest point: La Cave

Administration
- Administered under the Antarctic Treaty System

Demographics
- Population: 30
- Pop. density: 90/km^{2} (230/sq mi)

Petrel Island (French: Île des Pétrels) is a rocky island, 900 m long and 45 m in elevation, which lies north-west of Rostand Island and is the largest feature in the cluster of islands at the south-eastern end of Géologie Archipelago. It was photographed from the air by U.S. Navy Operation Highjump, 1946–47, charted by the French Antarctic Expedition, 1949–51, and so named by them because numerous snow petrel nests present. In January 1952, following destruction of the Port Martin base by fire, the French Antarctic Expedition under Marret, 1952–53, enlarged the hut on Petrel Island to serve as the new base site. The island is now the site of Dumont d'Urville Station.

== Features ==
- Mount Cervin
- Mount Joli

== Historic sites ==
The wooden building known as ‘Base Marret’, where seven men under Marret's command overwintered in 1952 following the fire at Port Martin, has been designated a Historic Site or Monument (HSM 47), following a proposal by France to the Antarctic Treaty Consultative Meeting. The iron cross on the north-east headland of the island is dedicated as a memorial to André Prudhomme, head meteorologist on the third International Geophysical Year expedition, who disappeared during a blizzard on 7 January 1959; it has similarly been designated a Historic Site or Monument (HSM 48).

== See also ==
- List of Antarctic and subantarctic islands
