= Géologie Archipelago =

Archipelago in Adélie Land, Antarctica

Coordinates: 66°39′S 139°55′E

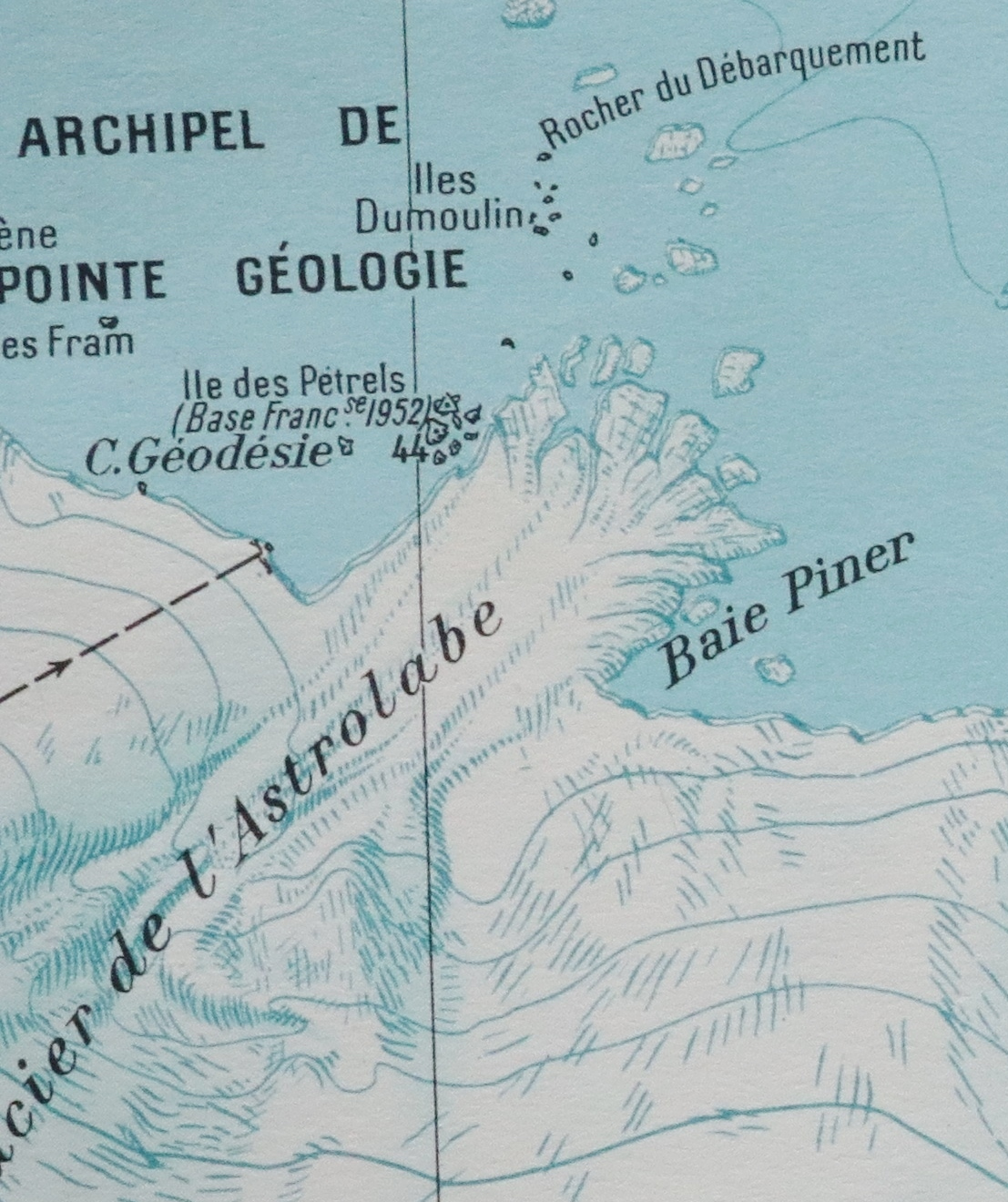
Map of Pointe Géologie archipelago, Service Hydrographique et Océanographique de la Marine.

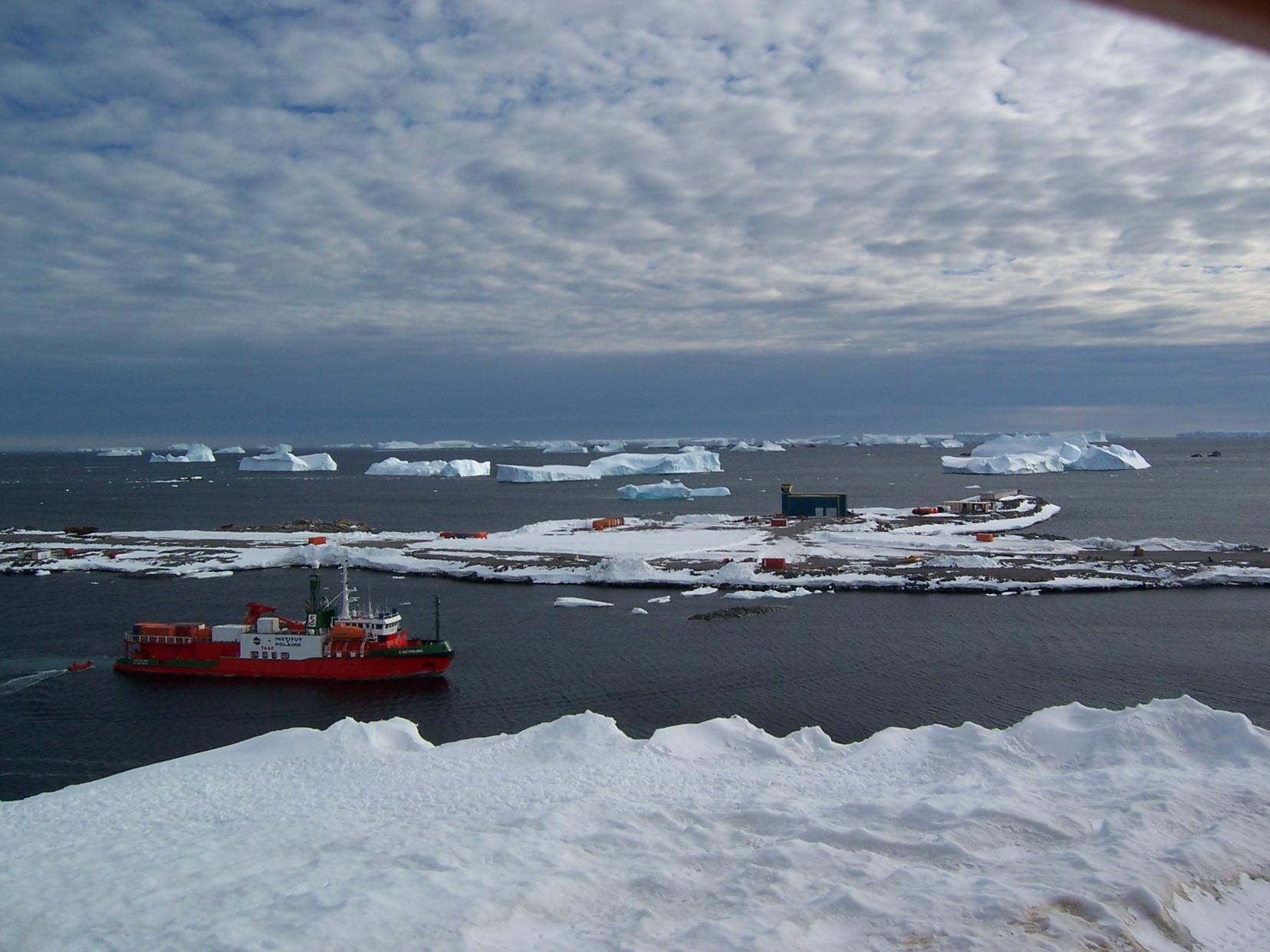
View of the Géologie Archipelago

The Géologie Archipelago, also known as the Pointe Géologie Archipelago, Geology Archipelago or Cape Geology Archipelago, is a small archipelago of rocky islands and rocks close to the north of Cape Géodésie and Astrolabe Glacier Tongue, extending from Helene Island on the west to the Dumoulin Islands on the east, in Adélie Land, Antarctica.

== History ==
The French expedition under Captain Jules Dumont d'Urville landed on Débarquement Rock in the Dumoulin Islands on 22 January 1840. Because rock samples were obtained, they gave the name "Pointe Géologie" to a coastal feature charted as lying south of Débarquement Rock. The archipelago was delineated, in part, from aerial photographs taken by the U.S. Navy's Operation Highjump in 1946–47. Following surveys by French Antarctic Expedition parties during the 1950–52 period, the French gave the name "Archipel de Pointe Géologie" to the entire archipelago, as d'Urville's coastal feature is believed to correlate with portions of the cluster of islands close to the north of Astrolabe Glacier Tongue.

In 1952, a small base was built on Île des Pétrels (Petrel Island) to study a nearby colony of emperor penguins. This base was called Base Marret. As the main base, Port Martin, was destroyed by fire on the night of 23 January 1952, Base Marret was chosen as the overwintering site for 1952–53. The new main base, Dumont d'Urville Station, was built on the same island, located 62 km (39 mi) west of Port Martin, and opened on 12 January 1956, to serve as a centre for French scientific research during the Antarctic International Geophysical Year 1957–58. The station has remained in active use ever since.

== Antarctic Specially Protected Area ==
A site cluster in the heart of the Géologie Archipelago, south and east, and in the immediate vicinity, of Petrel Island, comprises Jean Rostand, Le Mauguen, Claude Bernard and Lamarck Islands, Bon Docteur Nunatak, and a breeding site of emperor penguins on the intervening sea ice. The site is protected under the Antarctic Treaty System as Antarctic Specially Protected Area (ASPA) No.120. It was designated as such because it contains representative examples of terrestrial Antarctic ecosystems. Apart from the emperor penguin colony, the only one of about 30 in Antarctica that lies close to a permanent research station, birds nesting in the area include Adélie penguins, Antarctic skuas, Wilson's storm petrels southern giant petrels, snow petrels and Cape petrels. Weddell seals also occur there.

== Important Bird Area ==
A 37 ha site coincident with ASPA 120 has been designated an Important Bird Area (IBA) by BirdLife International because it supports about 3,600 pairs of emperor penguins as well as some 54,000 pairs of Adélie penguins, based on 2013 estimates.
