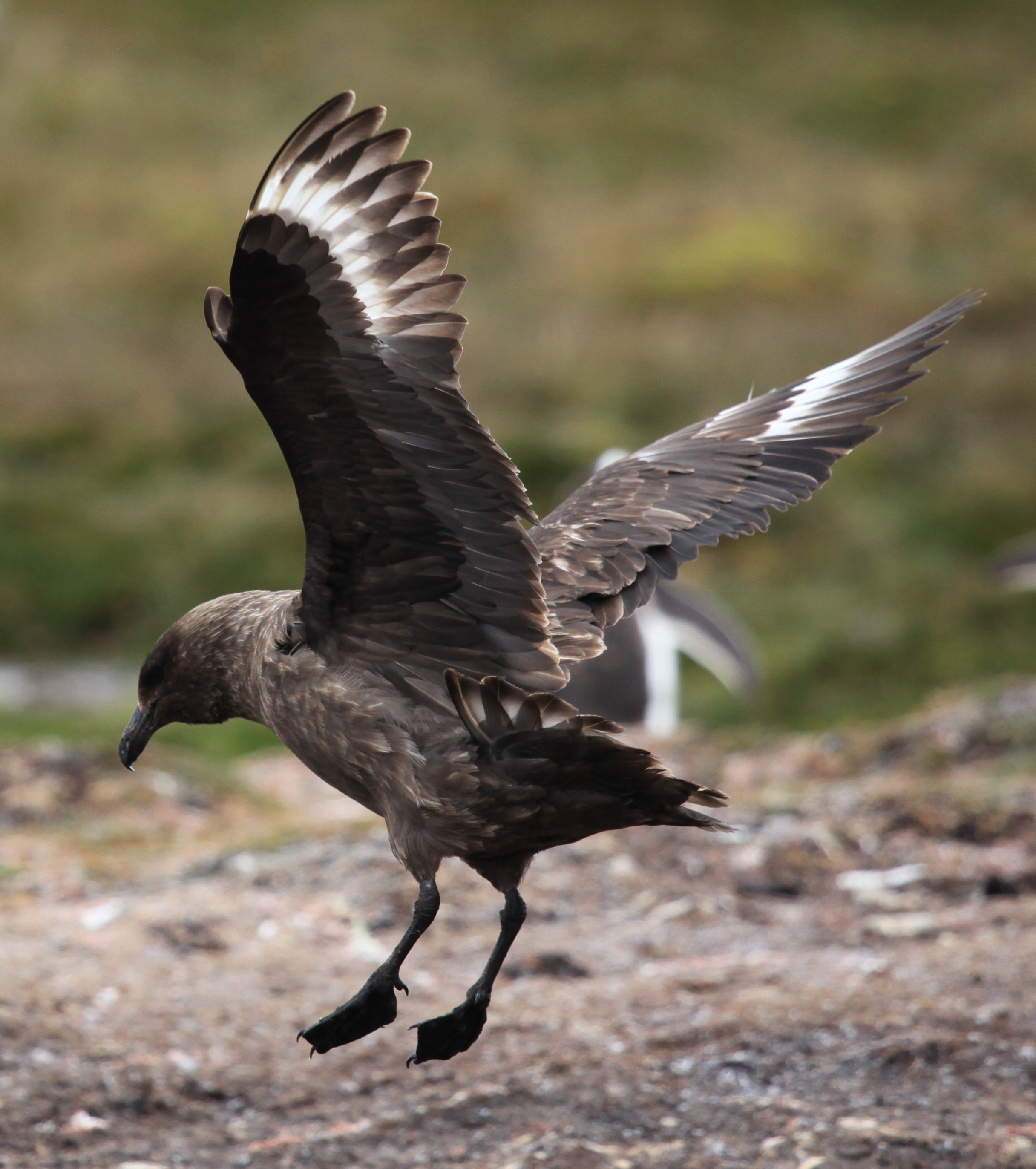
- At Godthul, South Georgia

Conservation status
- Least Concern (IUCN 3.1)

Scientific classification
- Kingdom: Animalia
- Phylum: Chordata
- Class: Aves
- Order: Charadriiformes
- Family: Stercorariidae
- Genus: Stercorarius
- Species: S. antarcticus

Binomial name
- Stercorarius antarcticus (Lesson, 1831)

Subspecies
- S. a. antarcticus – (Lesson, 1831); S. a. hamiltoni – (Hagen, 1952); S. a. lonnbergi – (Mathews, 1912)

Synonyms
- Catharacta antarctica

= Brown skua =

Species of bird

The brown skua (Stercorarius antarcticus), also known as the Antarctic skua, Subantarctic skua, southern great skua, southern skua, or hākoakoa (Māori), is a large seabird that breeds in the subantarctic and Antarctic zones and moves farther north when not breeding. Its taxonomy is highly complex and a matter of dispute, with some splitting it into two or three species: Falkland skua (S. antarcticus), Tristan skua (S. hamiltoni), and subantarctic skua (S. lonnbergi). To further confuse, it hybridizes with both the south polar and Chilean skuas, and the entire group has been considered to be a subspecies of the great skua, a species otherwise restricted to the Northern Hemisphere.

== Description ==
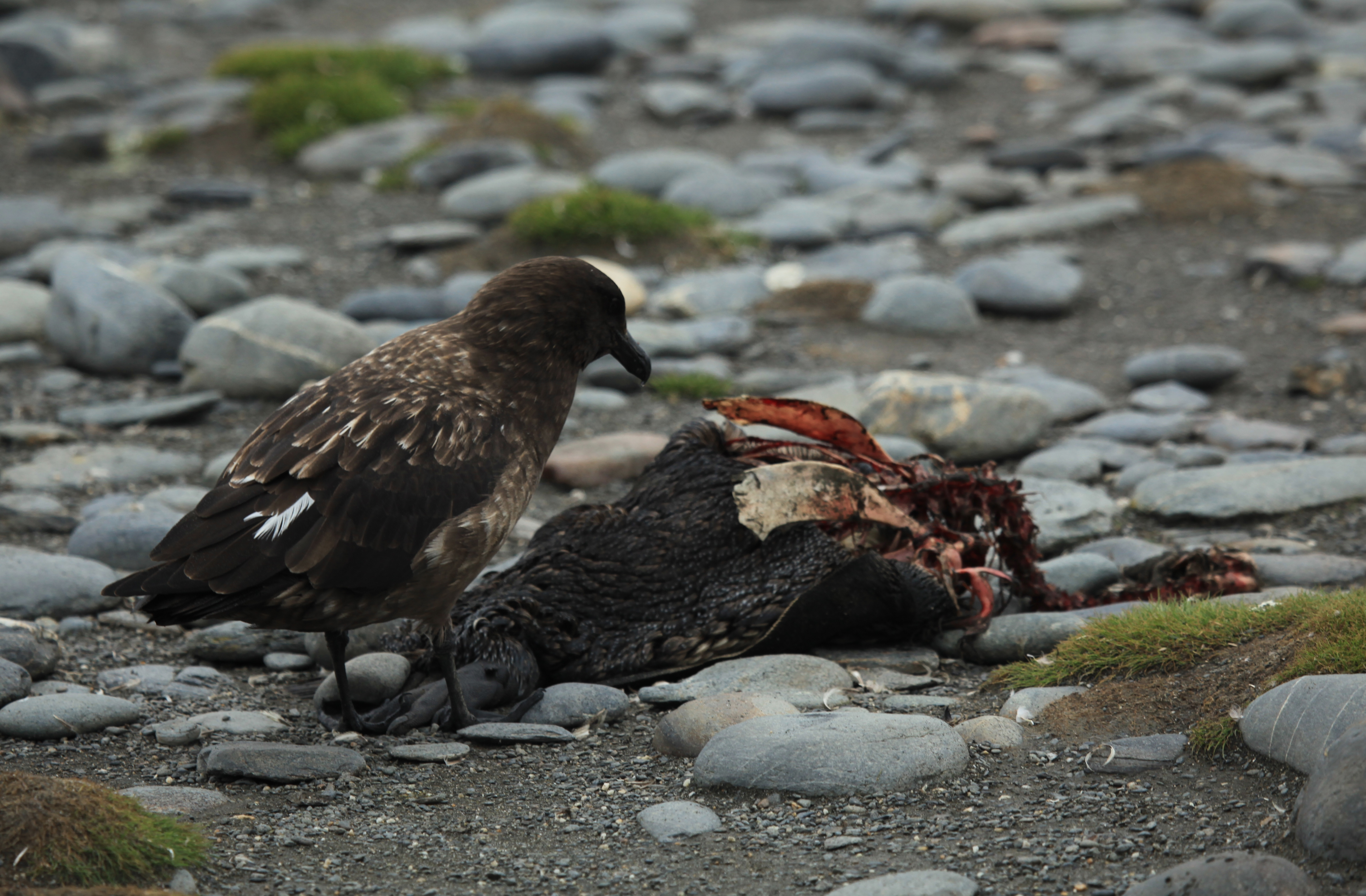
Brown skua eyeing a king penguin carcass

This is the heaviest species of skua and rivals the largest gulls, the great black-backed gull and glaucous gull, as the heaviest species in the shorebird order although not as large in length or wingspan. It is 52–64 cm (20–25 in) in length, 126–160 cm (50–63 in) in wingspan and has a body mass of 1.2–2.18 kg (2.6–4.8 lb). S. a. hamiltoni measured on Gough Island, weighed an average of 1.43 kg (3.2 lb) in 9 males and 1.65 kg (3.6 lb) in 9 females. S. a. lonnbergi measured in the Chatham Islands weighed an average of 1.73 kg (3.8 lb) in 30 males and an average of 1.93 kg (4.3 lb) in 32 females. The latter is one of the highest colony mean body mass for any living species of shorebird.

A study in 2016 reported that brown skuas can identify individual human beings, possibly indicating high cognitive abilities.

Brown skuas have been noted for sometimes bonding with humans who live for extended periods in Antarctica, such as the Eastern Orthodox clergymen at Trinity Church, and engaging in playful or apparently mischievous behavior with them.

== Taxonomy ==
There are three accepted subspecies:

- S. a. lonnbergi. Range: subantarctic.
- S. a. antarcticus. Range: Falkland Islands.
- S. a. hamiltoni. Range: Tristan da Cunha.

== Ecology ==
=== Diet ===
It feeds on fish (often via kleptoparasitism), penguin chicks and other seabirds, small mammals, eggs and carrion.
