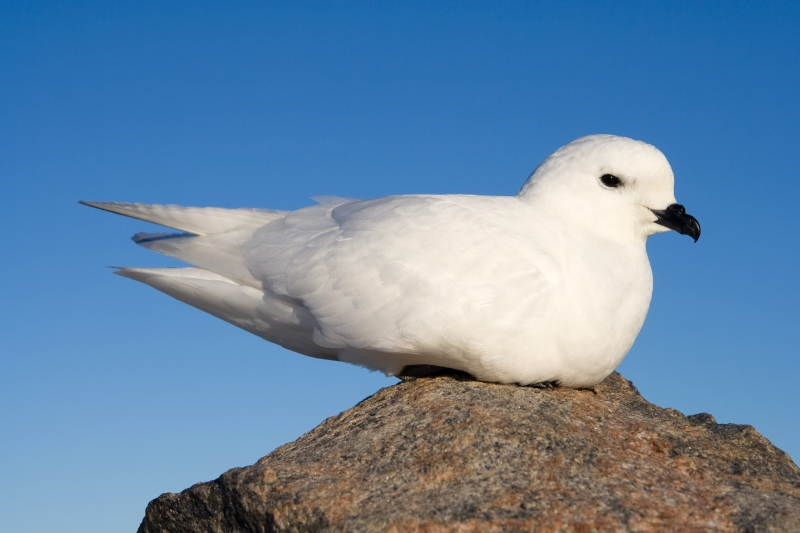

Conservation status
- Least Concern (IUCN 3.1)

Scientific classification
- Kingdom: Animalia
- Phylum: Chordata
- Class: Aves
- Order: Procellariiformes
- Family: Procellariidae
- Genus: Pagodroma; Bonaparte, 1856
- Species: P. nivea

Binomial name
- Pagodroma nivea (Forster, G, 1777)

Subspecies
- P. nivea nivea (G. Forster, 1777); P. nivea major (Schlegel, 1863)
- range

= Snow petrel =

Species of bird

The snow petrel (Pagodroma nivea) is the only member of the genus Pagodroma. It is one of only three birds that have been seen at the Geographic South Pole, along with the Antarctic petrel and the south polar skua, and it has the most southerly breeding sites of any bird, inland in Antarctica.

== Taxonomy ==
The snow petrel was described in 1777 by the German naturalist Georg Forster in his book A Voyage Round the World. He had accompanied James Cook on Cook's second voyage to the Pacific.

We particularly observed a petrel, about the size of a pigeon, entirely white, with a black bill and blueish feet; it constantly appeared about the icy masses, and may be looked upon as a sure fore-runner of ice.

Forster placed the snow petrel in the genus Procellaria that had been erected for the petrels by Carl Linnaeus in 1758 and coined the binomial name Procellaria nivea. The snow petrel is now the only species placed in the genus Pagodroma that was introduced for the snow petrel in 1856 by French naturalist Charles Lucien Bonaparte. The genus name combines the Ancient Greek pagos meaning "frost" or "sea-ice" with dromos meaning "racer" or "runner". The specific epithet is from the Latin niveus meaning "snow-white". The word "petrel" is derived from Peter the Apostle and the story of his walking on water. This is in reference to the petrel's habit of appearing to run on the water to take off.

Snow petrels vary significantly in size with two different forms, a larger and a smaller. The two forms hybridise extensively, and this has led to uncertainty about the taxonomic status and the precise geographic distribution of the different types. In 1857 Bonaparte in his Conspectus Generum Avium listed subspecies major and minor but as he provided no further information, these names are not recognised and are considered as nomen nudum. The German ornithologist Hermann Schlegel in 1863 provided descriptions for the subspecies minor and major but erroneously believed that Forster's original description applied to the larger form. In 1912 Gregory Mathews, in the second volume of his Birds of Australia, treated the larger form as a separate species and introduced the binomial name Pagodroma confusa. The two forms are now usually treated as subspecies and Schlege is acknowledged as the authority for the larger subspecies.

The snow petrel is a member of the family Procellariidae and the order Procellariiformes. They all share certain identifying features. First, they have nasal passages that attach to the upper bill called naricorns. The bills of Procellariiformes are also unique in that they are split into seven to nine horny plates. They produce a stomach oil made up of wax esters and triglycerides that is stored in the proventriculus. This can be sprayed out of their mouths as a defense against predators (principally skuas) and as an energy-rich food source for the chicks and for the adults during their long flights. Finally, they also have a salt gland situated above the nasal passage which helps desalinate their bodies, due to the high amount of ocean water that they imbibe. It excretes a high saline solution from their nostrils.

=== Subspecies ===
Two subspecies are recognised:

- P. n. nivea (Forster, G, 1777) — breeds on the Antarctic Peninsula, South Georgia Islands, and other islands of the Scotia Arc
- P. n. major (Schlegel, 1863), formerly P. n. confusa (Mathews, 1912) — breeds on the South Sandwich Islands and Géologie Archipelago

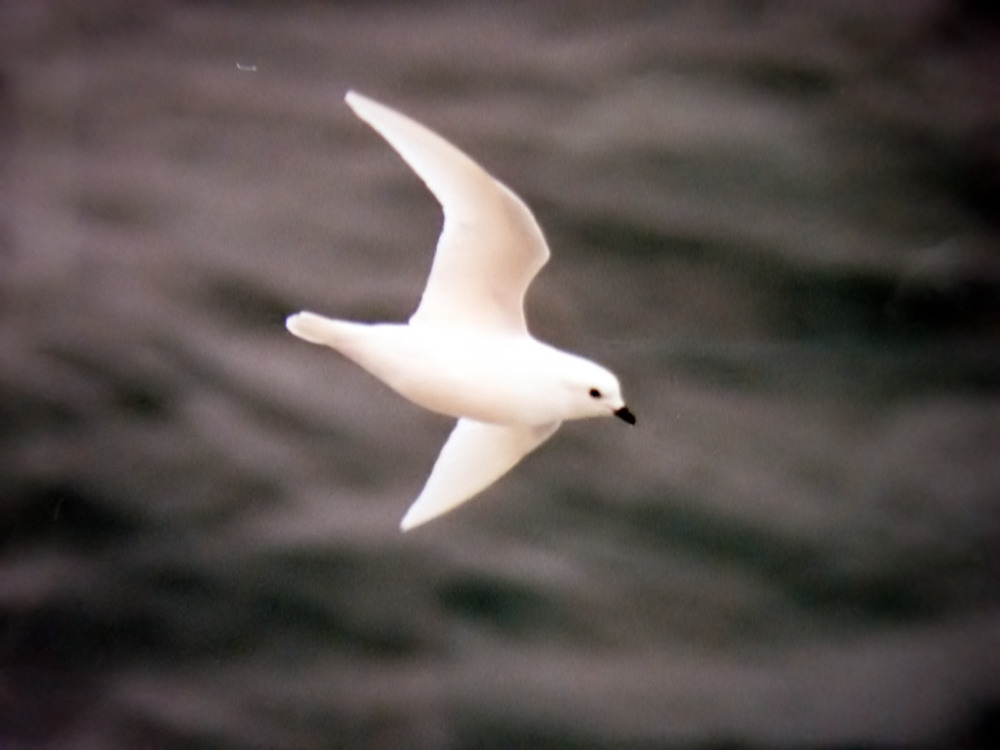
Snow petrel, P. nivea in Ross Sea

== Description ==
The snow petrel is a small, pure white fulmarine petrel with coal-black eyes, a small black bill and bluish gray feet. Body length is 30–40 cm (12–16 in) and the wingspan is 75–95 cm (30–37 in). Flight is erratic with frequent changes of direction.

== Behavior ==
Snow petrels are almost entirely restricted to cold Antarctic waters. Flocks are characteristically seen sitting on icebergs.

=== Breeding ===
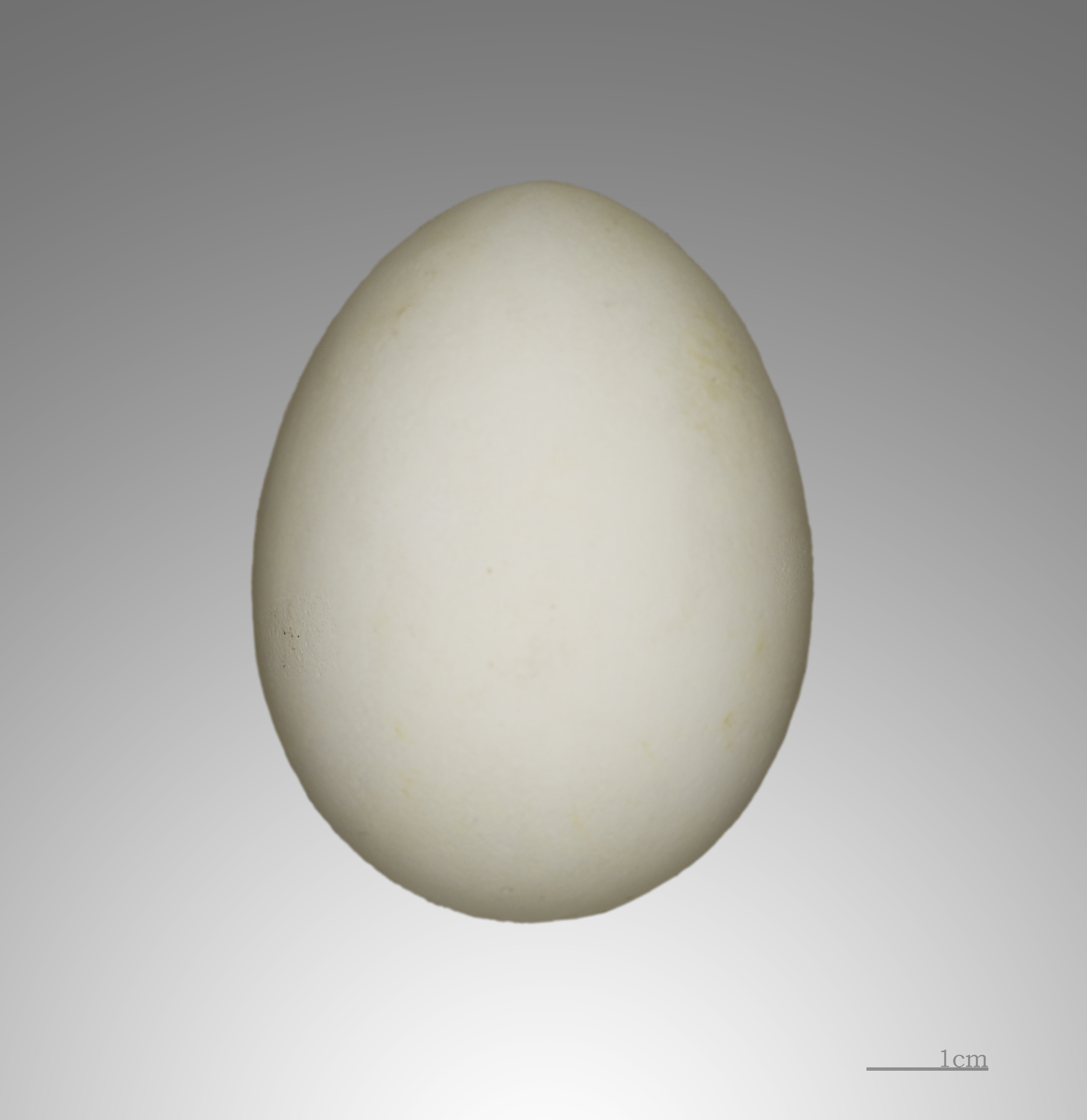
Pagodroma nivea – MHNT

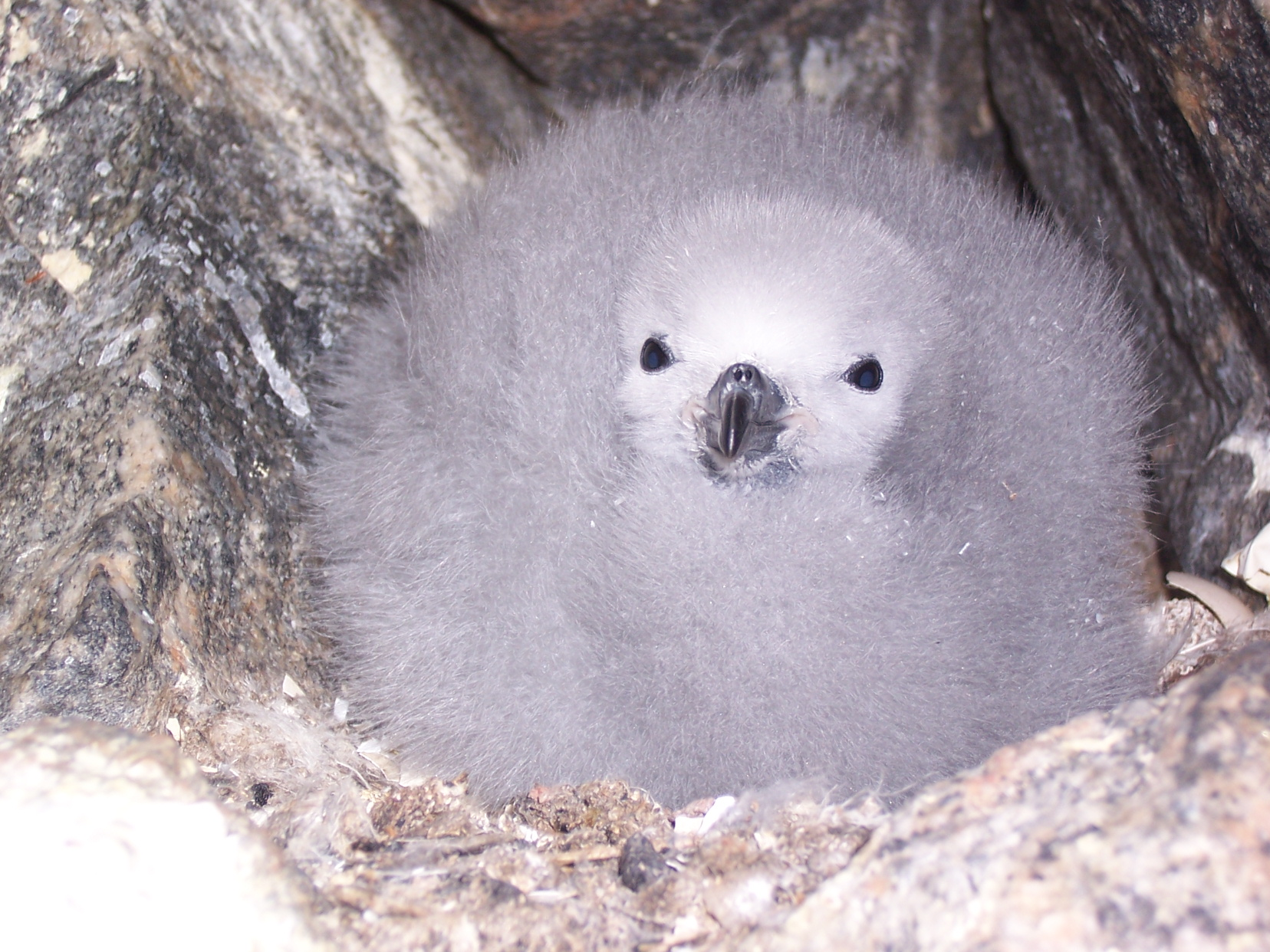
Snow petrel chick

Breeding occurs in colonies on the Antarctic continent and on various Antarctic islands. Nesting is colonial in small to large colonies on exposed rocks, usually near the sea, but also on inland mountain ranges more than 400 km (250 mi) from the open sea. Some birds remain at the colony all year, but the main influx at colonies is from the mid-September until early November. Nests are simple pebble-lined scrapes usually in a deep rock crevices with overhanging protection. Nests are abandoned if concealed by heavy snowfall; egg mortality is 50%, and chick mortality is 10–15%. One white egg is laid between late November and mid-December. The egg is incubated 41 to 49 days and the chick is brooded for 8 days. They fledge 7 weeks later in late February to mid-May. Colonies are also the sites of cleaning areas where snow petrels, far from the sea, bathe in snow.

Snow petrel partners are faithful for life (around 20 years).

=== Feeding ===
Snow petrels feed mainly on fish, some cephalopods, mollusks, and krill, as well as carrion in the form of seal placentas, dead/stillborn seals, whale carcasses, and dead penguin chicks. During the winter, they disperse to the pack ice, ice floes, and the open sea. Flocks are characteristically seen sitting on icebergs. Only very rarely are they observed north of the pack ice.

== Conservation ==
The snow petrel has an occurrence range of 35,900,000 km^{2} (13,861,067 sq mi) and an estimated population of 4 million adult birds. Based on these numbers, the IUCN has classified this bird as least concern.
