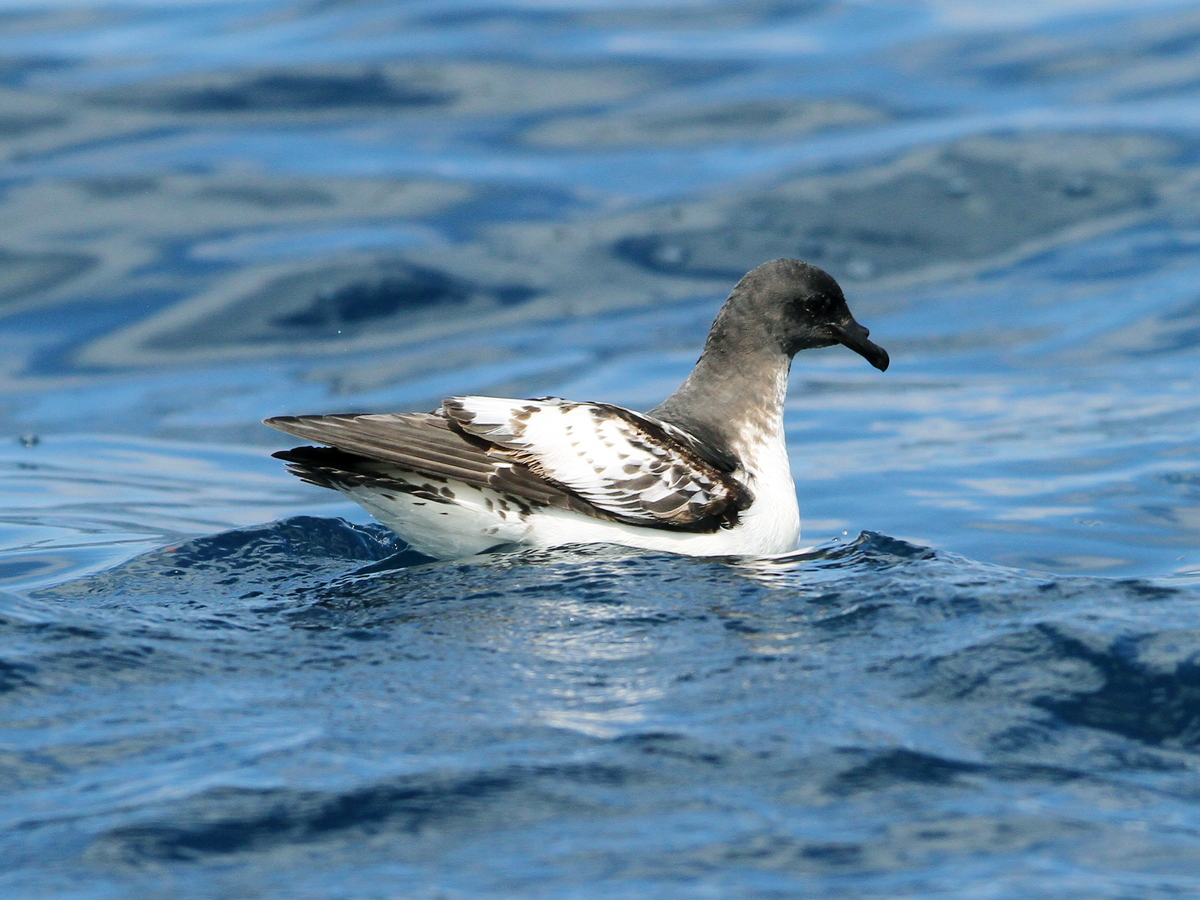
- Daption capense capense at sea off the Cape of Good Hope, South Africa

Conservation status
- Least Concern (IUCN 3.1)

Scientific classification
- Kingdom: Animalia
- Phylum: Chordata
- Class: Aves
- Order: Procellariiformes
- Family: Procellariidae
- Genus: Daption; Stephens, 1826
- Species: D. capense

Binomial name
- Daption capense (Linnaeus, 1758)

Subspecies
- D. capense capense (Linnaeus, 1758); D. capense australe Mathews, 1913

Synonyms
- Procellaria capensis Linnaeus, 1758

= Pintado petrel =

Species of bird

The pintado petrel (Daption capense), also called the Cape petrel, or Cape fulmar, is a common seabird of the Southern Ocean from the family Procellariidae. It is the only member of the genus Daption, and is allied to the fulmarine petrels and the giant petrels. It is an abundant seabird, with an estimated population of around 2 million.

== Taxonomy ==
The pintado petrel was formally described by the Swedish naturalist Carl Linnaeus in 1758 in the tenth edition of his Systema Naturae under the binomial name Procellaria capensis. Linnaeus cited the "white and black spotted peteril" that had been described and illustrated in 1747 by the English naturalist George Edwards in the second volume of his A Natural History of Uncommon Birds. The pintado petrel is now the only species placed in the genus Daption, introduced in 1826 by English naturalist James Francis Stephens. The genus name Daption is an anagram of the Portuguese name "Pintado" which was given to the species by navigators because of its pied plumage. Pintado is Portuguese and Spanish for "painted". The specific epithet capense signifies the Cape of Good Hope, the locality where the type specimen was collected. The word petrel is derived from Saint Peter and the story of his walking on water. This is in reference to the petrel's habit of appearing to run on the water to take off. Historically, it was also sometimes known as "Cape pigeon", due to early sailors thinking it resembled a pigeon.

All Procellariiformes share certain identifying features. First, they have nasal passages that attach to the upper bill called naricorns. The bills of Procellariiformes are also unique in that they are split into between seven and nine horny plates. They produce a stomach oil made up of wax esters and triglycerides that is stored in the proventriculus. This can be sprayed out of their mouths as a defence against predators and as an energy rich food source for chicks and for the adults during their long flights. Finally, they also have a salt gland that is situated above the nasal passage and helps desalinate their bodies, due to the high amount of ocean water that they imbibe. It excretes a high saline solution from their nose.

== Description ==
The pintado petrel has a black head and neck, and a white belly, breast, and its underwing is white with a black border. Its back, and upperwings are black and white speckled, as is its tail which also has a band of black. It is 35–40 cm (14–16 in) long and the wingspan 80–90 cm (31–35 in).

Two subspecies are recognised, though intermediates occur:

- D. c. capense (Linnaeus, 1758) – breeds on circumpolar subantarctic islands, winters at sea north to around the Tropic of Capricorn and locally further north in cold currents (to the Equator around the Galapagos Islands). Larger; back white with black spots.
- D. c. australe Mathews, 1913 – breeds on subantarctic islands around and south of New Zealand, extends northwest to southeastern Australian waters outside of the breeding season. Smaller; back solid blackish-brown down to the top of rump.

== Distribution and habitat ==
During breeding season, pintado petrels feed at sea around Antarctica, and during the winter they range further north, as far as Angola and the Galapagos Islands. They breed on many islands of Antarctica and the subantarctic islands, some as far north as the Auckland Islands, the Chatham Islands, Campbell Island. Their main breeding grounds are on the Antarctic Peninsula, South Georgia, the Balleny Islands, the Kerguelen Islands, as well as islands in the Scotia Sea. Birds have been reported from Northern Hemisphere waters, but are of unknown origin, probably captured by sailors and released in northern waters.

== Behaviour ==
=== Diet ===
The diet is 80% crustaceans, as well as fish and squid. Krill is their favoured crustacean, which they obtain by surface seizing as well as diving under water and filtering them out. They are also well known for following ships and eating edible waste and carcasses thrown overboard. They are aggressive while feeding and will spit their stomach oil at competitors, even their own species.

=== Breeding ===
They are colonial birds, and nest on cliffs or level ground within a kilometre of the ocean. They tend to have smaller colonies than other petrels. Their nests are formed with pebbles and shells and are placed under overhanging rock for protection, or in a crevice. In November they lay a single clear white egg, which is incubated for 45 days by both sexes. The egg usually measures 53 by 38 millimetres (2.1 in × 1.5 in). Like most other fulmars, they will defend their nest by spitting stomach oil. Skuas in particular will prey on pintado petrel eggs and chicks. Upon hatching, the chick is brooded for ten days until it can thermoregulate, after which both parents assist in the feeding. The chicks fledge after 45 more days, around March.

== Conservation ==
The pintado petrel has an occurrence range of 146,000,000 km^{2} (56,370,915 sq mi) and a 2009 estimate places their population of adult birds at 2 million. Consequently, the IUCN rates them as least concern.

== Gallery ==
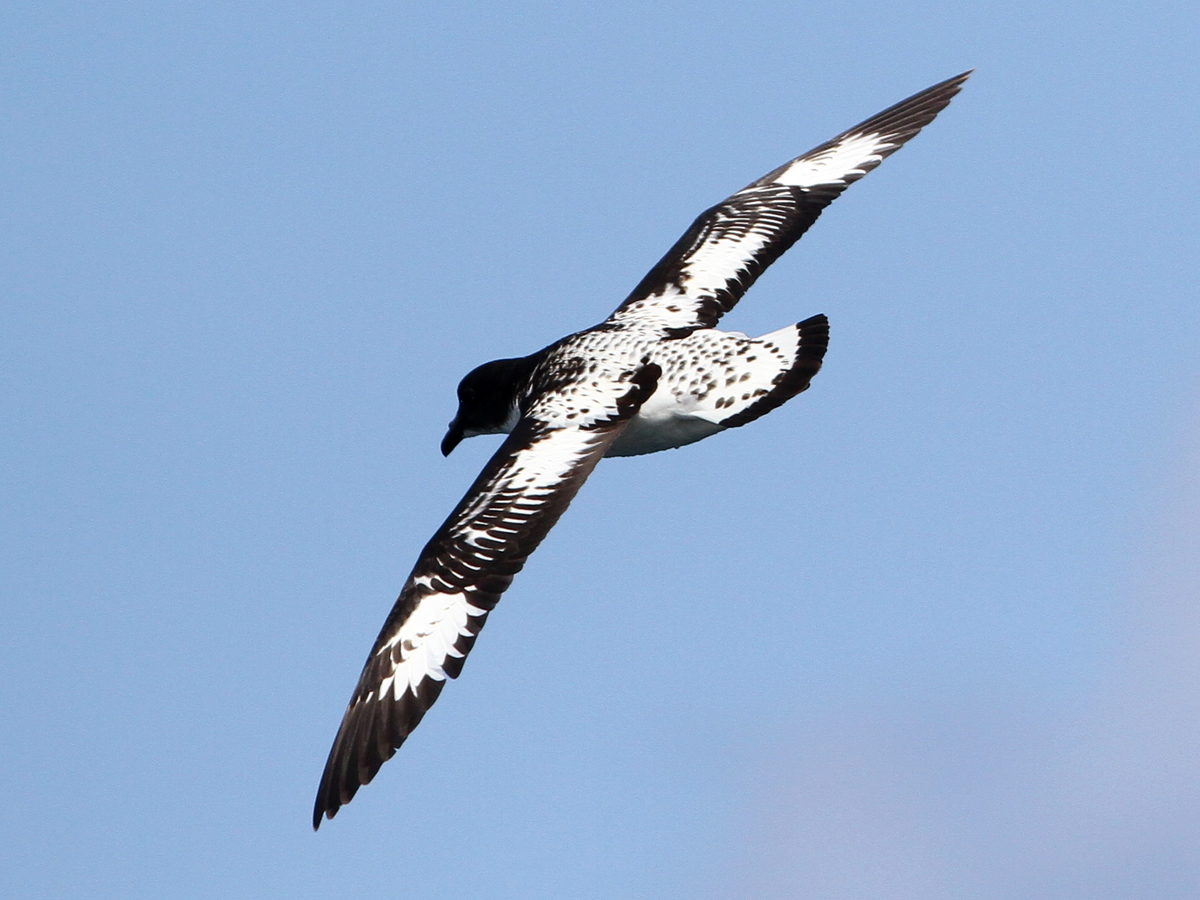
D. c. capense in flight, upperwing pattern; off Cape of Good Hope

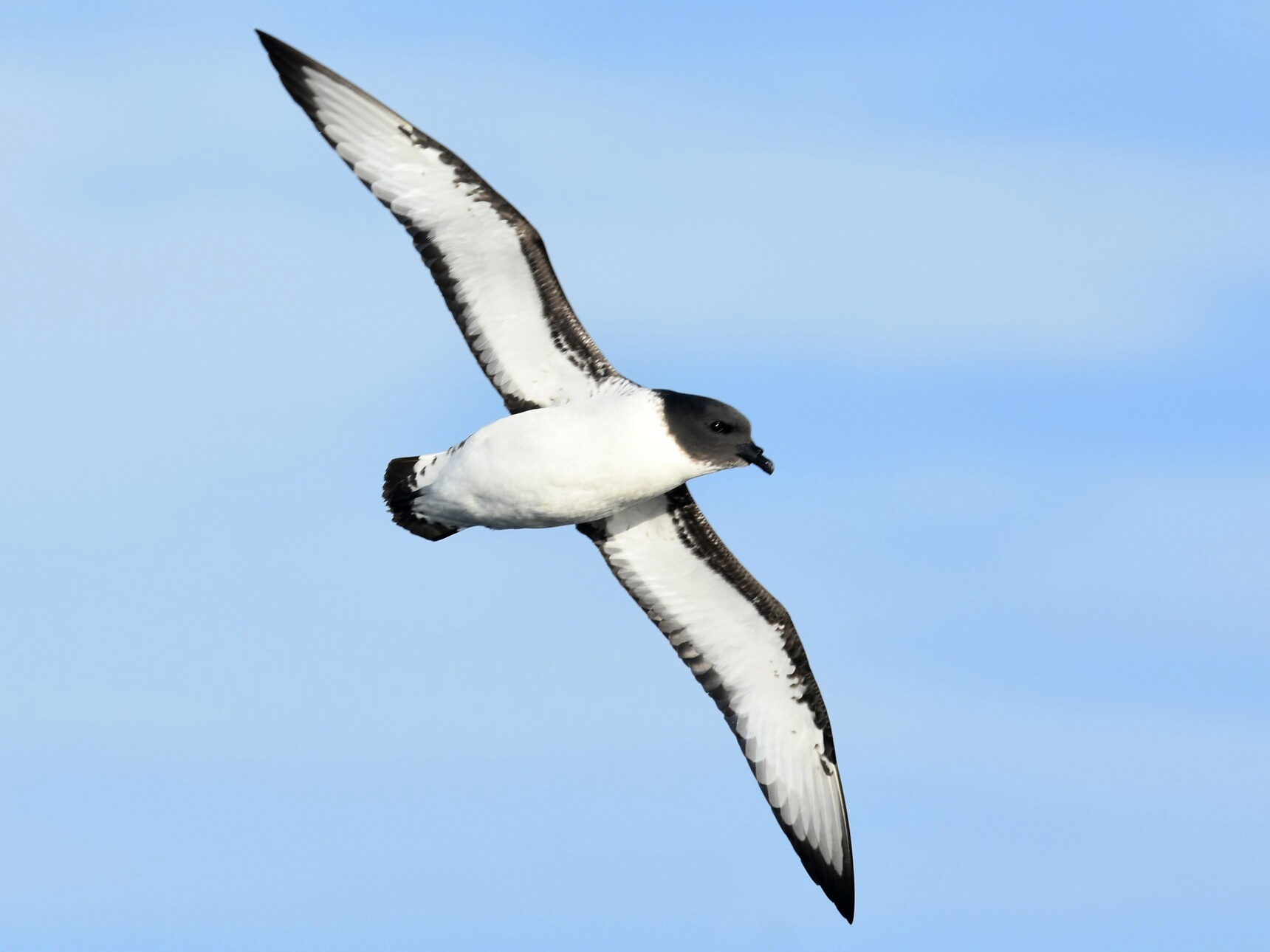
D. c. capense in flight, underwing pattern; off Cape of Good Hope

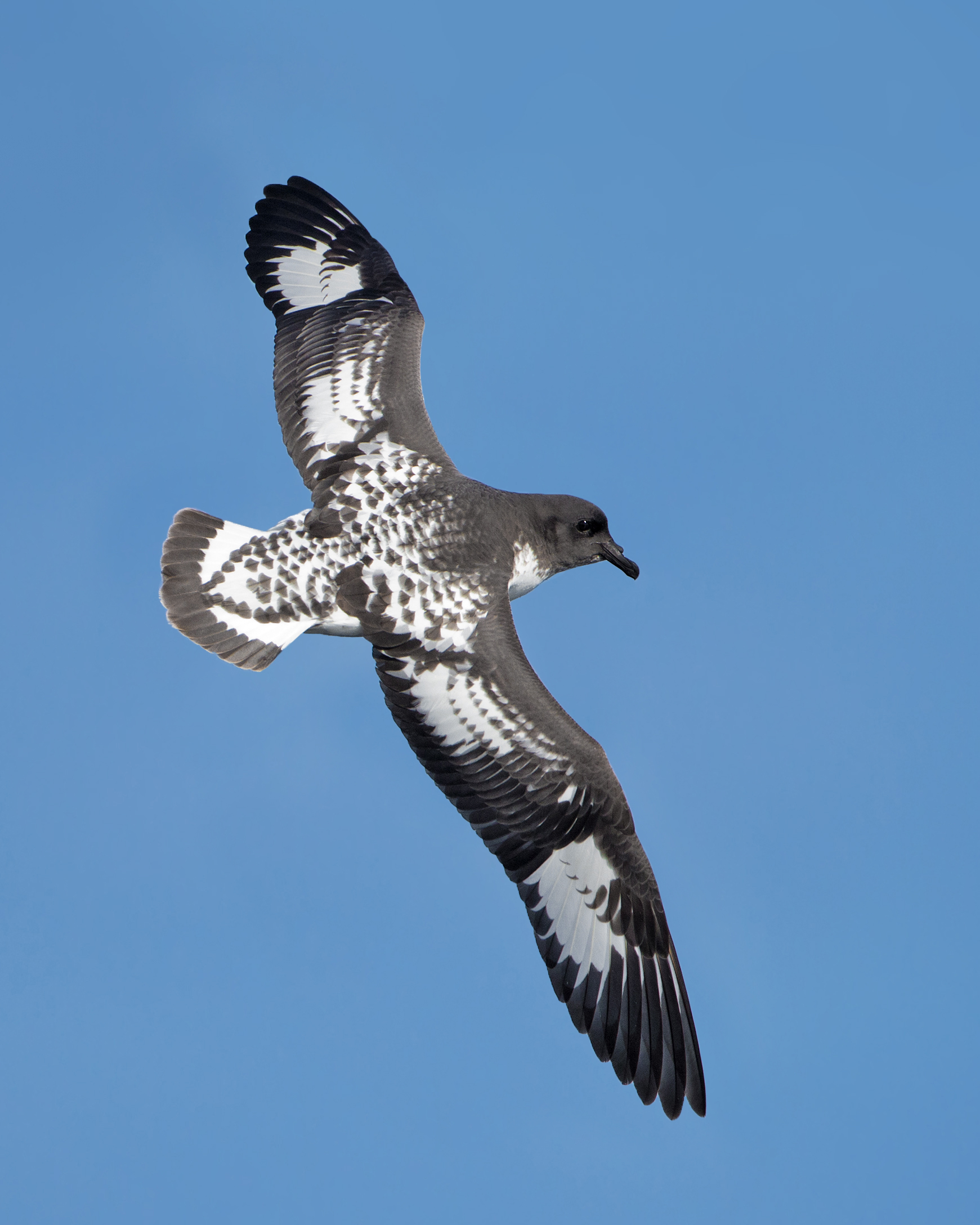
D. c. capense or intergrade with D. c. australe, southeast of Tasmania

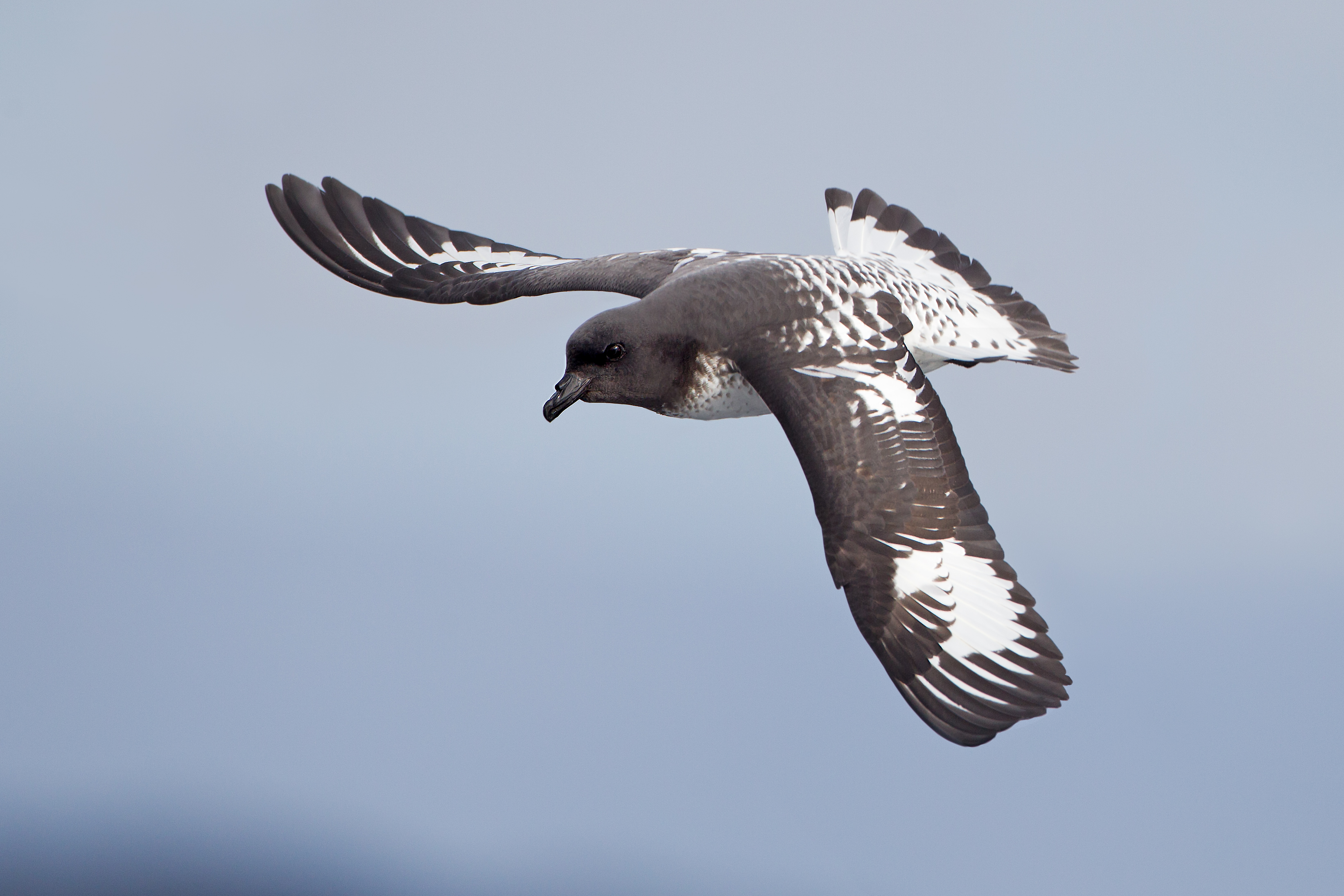
D. c. australe southeast of Tasmania; note dark back.

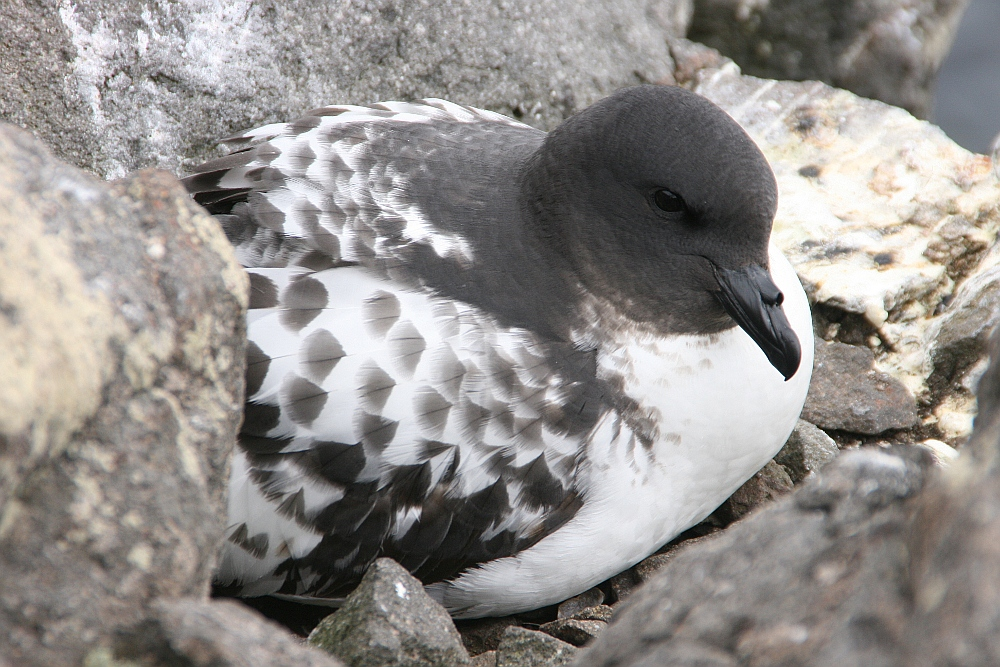
Nesting on King George Island

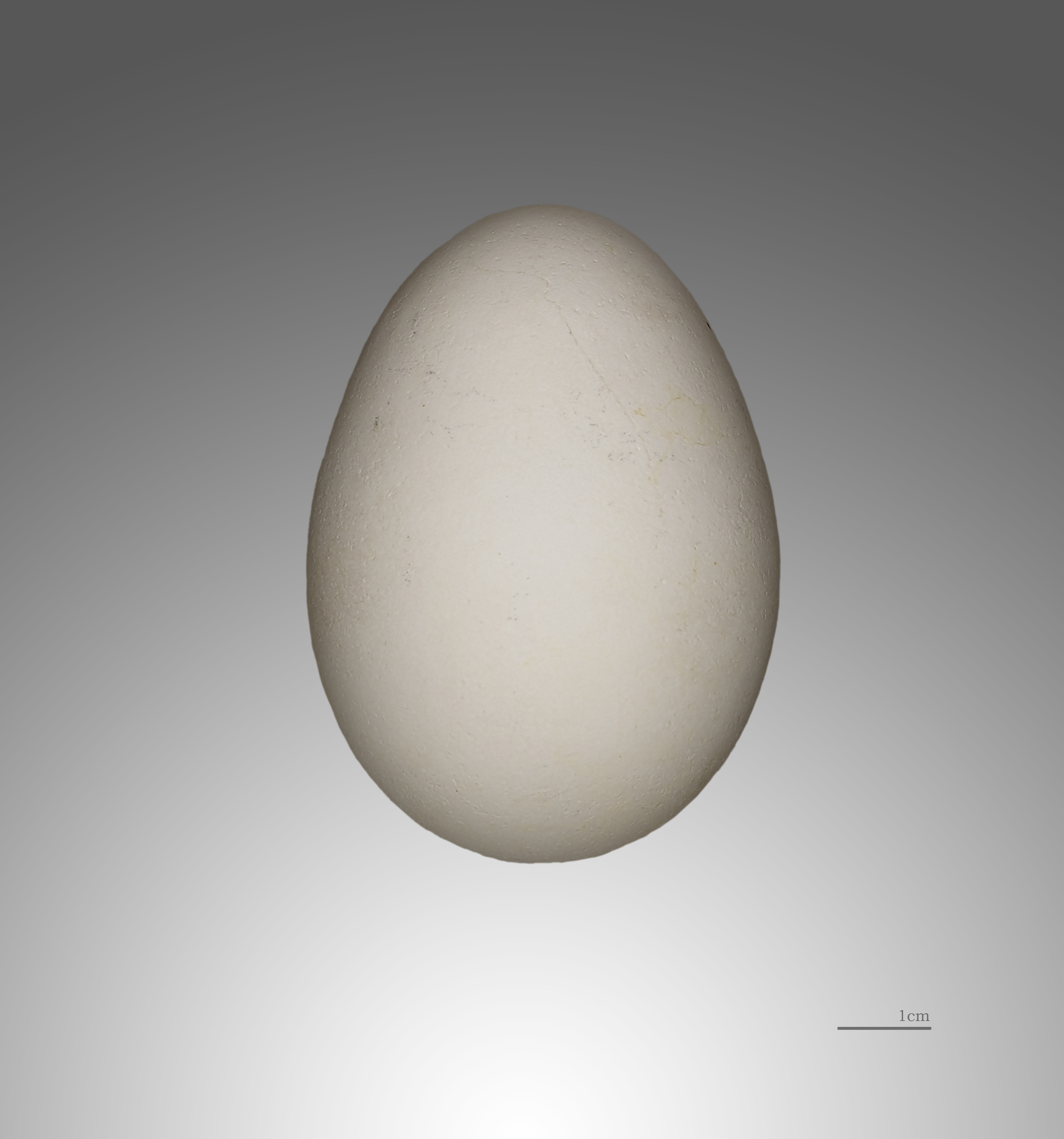
Egg

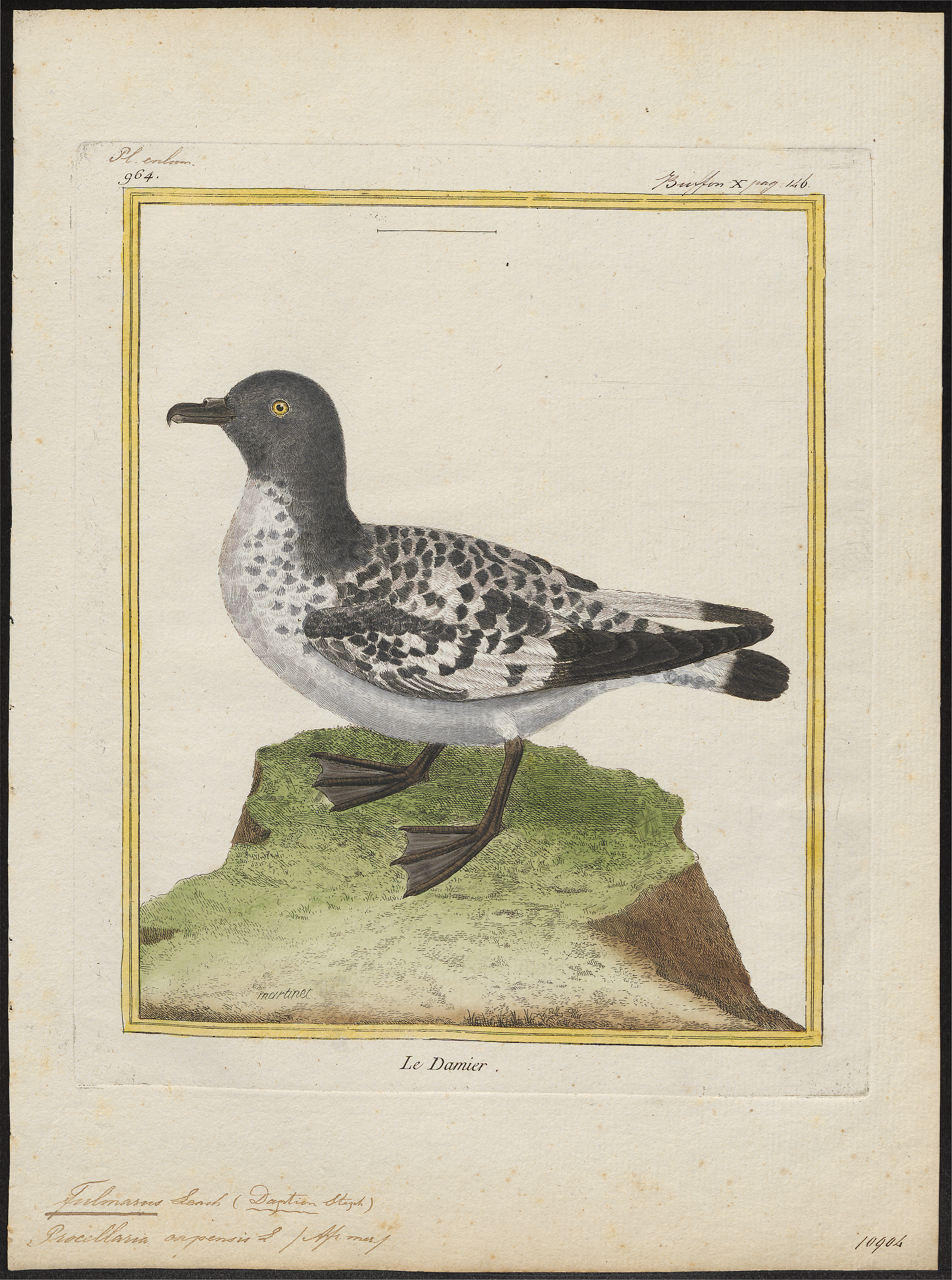
Illustration

== Sources ==
- Double, M. C. (2003). "Procellariiformes (Tubenosed Seabirds)". In Hutchins, Michael; Jackson, Jerome A.; Bock, Walter J.; Olendorf, Donna (eds.). Grzimek's Animal Life Encyclopedia. Vol. 8 Birds I Tinamous and Ratites to Hoatzins. Joseph E. Trumpey, Chief Scientific Illustrator (2nd ed.). Farmington Hills, MI: Gale Group. pp. 107–111. ISBN 0-7876-5784-0.
- Ehrlich, Paul R.; Dobkin, David S.; Wheye, Darryl (1988). The Birders Handbook (First ed.). New York, NY: Simon & Schuster. pp. 29–31. ISBN 0-671-65989-8.
- Gotch, A. F. (1995) [1979]. "Albatrosses, Fulmars, Shearwaters, and Petrels". Latin Names Explained A Guide to the Scientific Classifications of Reptiles, Birds & Mammals. New York, NY: Facts on File. pp. 191–192. ISBN 0-8160-3377-3.
- Harrison, C.; Greensmith, A. (1993). Bunting, E. (ed.). Birds of the World. New York, NY: Dorling Kindersley. p. 50. ISBN 1-56458-295-7.
- ZipCode Zoo (3 Jul 2009). "Daption capense australe (Snare Cape Pigeon)". BayScience Foundation. Archived from the original on 2012-06-09.
