= Fulmarine petrel =

Group of birds

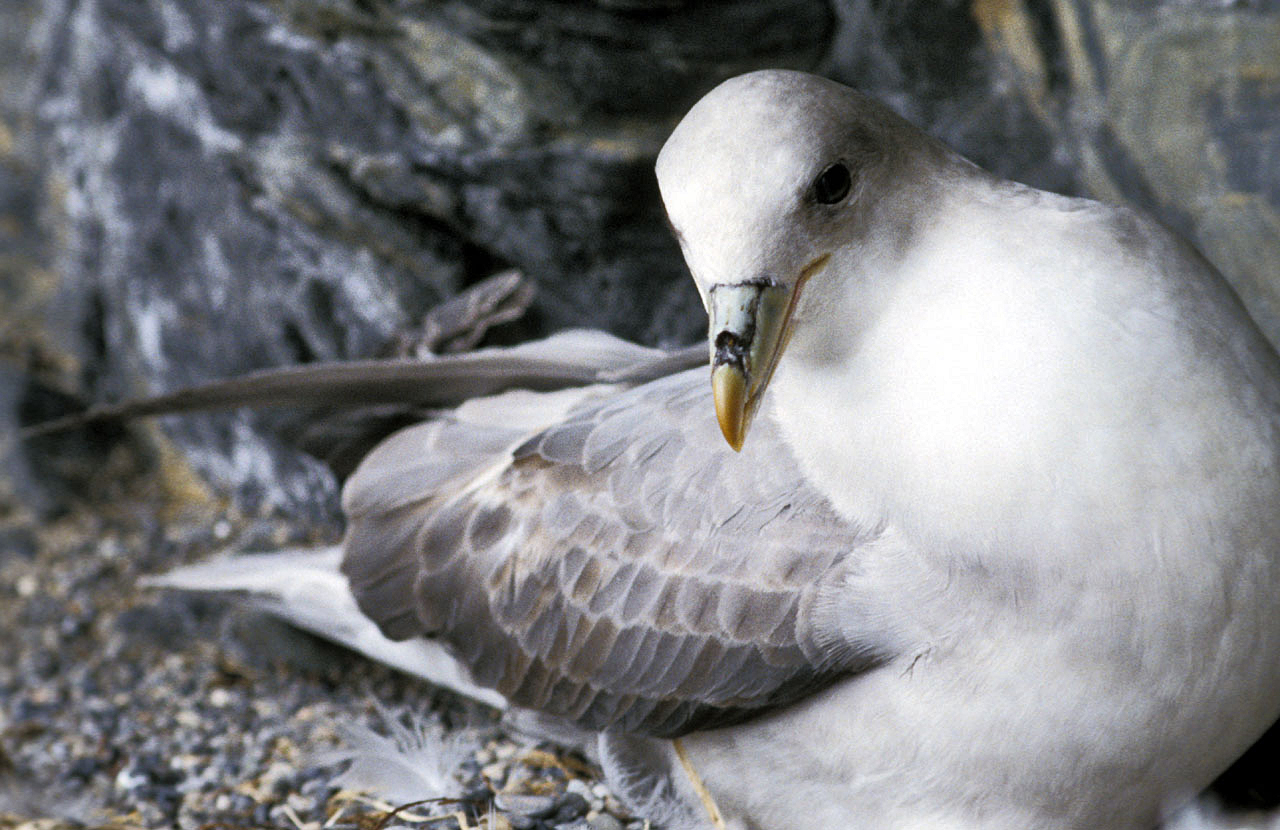
Northern fulmar

The fulmarine petrels or fulmar-petrels are a distinct group of petrels within the family Procellariidae. They are the most variable of the four groups within the Procellariidae, differing greatly in size and biology. They do, however, have a unifying feature, their skull, and in particular their nasal tubes. They are predominantly found in the Southern Ocean with one species, the northern fulmar, ranging in the North Pacific and Atlantic Oceans.

Fossils of fulmarine petrels dating back to the Upper Miocene have been found in Menorca.

== Taxonomy ==
A multigene genetic study published in 2021 provided a genus-level phylogeny of extant genera in the family and showed that the fulmarine petrels make an apparent clade.

- Procellariidae
  - - Pagodroma – snow petrel
    - - Thalassoica – Antarctic petrel
      - - Daption – Cape petrel
        - - Macronectes – giant petrels (2 species)
          - Fulmarus – fulmars (2 species)
  - - - - Pelecanoides – diving petrels (4 species)
        - - Halobaena – blue petrel
          - Pachyptila – prions (7 species)
      - - Aphrodroma – Kerguelen petrel
        - Pterodroma – gadfly petrels (35 species)
    - - - Bulweria – petrels (2 extant species)
        - Pseudobulweria – petrels (4 species)
      - - Procellaria – petrels (5 species)
        - - Puffinus – shearwaters (21 species)
          - - Calonectris – shearwaters (4 species)
            - Ardenna – shearwaters (7 species)

== Species by genus ==
=== Macronectes ===
Macronectes includes:

- Macronectes halli, northern giant petrel, located in the southern oceans, north of the Antarctic Convergence
- Macronectes giganteus, southern giant petrel, located in the southern oceans, and southern polar region south to the pack ice

=== Fulmarus ===
Fulmarus includes:

- Fulmarus glacialis, northern fulmar, breeds in the North Atlantic, along the coast of eastern Siberia, and the Alaskan Peninsula. Ranges through the North Atlantic Ocean and the North Pacific Ocean,
  - Fulmarus glacialis glacialis breeds in the high Arctic region of the North Atlantic
  - Fulmarus glacialis auduboni breeds in the low Arctic and boreal Arctic of the North Atlantic
  - Fulmarus glacialis rodgersii breeds along the coast of eastern Siberia and the Alaskan Peninsula
- Fulmarus glacialoides, southern fulmar, located in the southern polar region; South Atlantic Ocean and the South Pacific Ocean

=== Thalassoica ===
Thalassoica includes:

- Thalassoica antarctica, Antarctic petrel, breeds along the Antarctic coast and on the Antarctic islands. Ranges through the southern polar region

=== Daption ===
Daption includes:

- Daption capense, Cape petrel, breeds on the circumpolar and New Zealand subantarctic islands, ranges throughout the southern polar region, and coastal waters off the west coast of South America
  - Daption capense capense breeds on the circumpolar subantarctic islands, ranges throughout the southern oceans
  - Daption capense australe breeds on the New Zealand subantarctic islands, ranges throughout the southern oceans

=== Pagodroma ===
Pagodroma includes:

- Pagodroma nivea, snow petrel, located in the southern polar region
  - Pagodroma nivea nivea, breeds on the South Georgia Islands and adjacent islands, Scotia Arc, and the Antarctic Peninsula
  - Pagodroma nivea confusa, breeds on the South Sandwich Islands and the Géologie Archipelago

=== Pterodromoides ===
Pterodromoides is a monotypic genus of extinct fulmarine petrels containing only Pterodromoides minoricensis
