= Pterodromoides =

Pterodromoides Temporal range: Late Miocene

Scientific classification
- Kingdom: Animalia
- Phylum: Chordata
- Class: Aves
- Order: Procellariiformes
- Family: Procellariidae
- Genus: Pterodromoides; Seguí et al., 2001
- Species: P. minoricensis

Binomial name
- Pterodromoides minoricensis Seguí et al., 2001

Extinct genus of birds

Pterodromoides is an extinct genus of fulmarine petrel dating from the Late Miocene. It contains a single species, P. minoricensis. Its fossil remains were first discovered at the Punta Nati palaeontological site on the island of Menorca in the Balearic archipelago of the western Mediterranean. An additional specimen from North Carolina, USA has also been referred to this species, suggesting it lived across the North Atlantic. It was described in 2001, with the authors justifying the creation of a new genus by the large orbitonasal opening and characters of the postcranial skeleton, despite the similarity of the cranial osteology to that of Pagodroma.

== Discovery and naming ==
The fossilized remains of Pterodromoides were found in blocks of sediment excavated from Punta Nati, Menorca in August 1995 by Josep Quintana and Salvador Moyà-Solà. Bones of various vertebrates were present in these blocks, the most abundant being those of procellariids. A small sample of these, including a skull and some postcranial remains, were recognized to represent a new genus and species, which was named Pterodromoides minoricensis in 2001. A cranium (IPS 11826) was designated as the holotype of this species. The generic name derives from its resemblance to Pterodroma in shape and proportions. The specific epithet refers to the type locality of Menorca. In addition, a partial left humerus (USNM 464315) found in the deposits of the Yorktown Formation at Lee Creek Mine, North Carolina, has been referred to P. minoricensis.

== Description ==
A medium-sized bird, Pterodromoides was comparable in shape and proportions to extant petrels of the genus Pterodroma. Similarly to the snow petrel, it has a very broad nasofrontal hinge and interorbital bridge, as well as fused prefrontals. A curved and narrow salt gland impression is present. The orbitonasal foramen is large while the postorbital process is small, and located vertically above the zygomatic process. A strongly developed temporal crest and narrow temporal fossa are also observed.

Under the humeral head, the humerus has a narrow hollow extending a quarter the width between the ventral and dorsal tubercles. These two tubercles are comparable in size, and the dorsal tubercle is located dorsally on the ridge of the capital shaft. Unlike Puffinus, this species has a round humeral shaft with no flattening. A long, deep and narrow groove is left by the transverse humeral ligament. The brachial fossa is intermediate in depth between those of Pachyptila and Puffinus, as well as rounder than those of Fulmarus. The distal width of the humerus ranges from 8.9 to 9.6 mm across specimens.

The tarsometatarsus does not exhibit the lateromedial compression seen in Puffinus, and the proportions resemble those of Cookilaria. An elongated depression on the anterior side is surrounded by the lateral and medial ridges. The proximal end is symmetrical, and the middle shaft expanded mediolaterally.

== Classification ==
Seguí et al. recognized Pterodromoides to be a species of petrel in the family Procellariidae, occupying a basal position among the fulmarine petrels. Although it shows some features resembling those of shearwaters, the general structures of the cranium, coracoid and humerus are most similar to gadfly petrels.

== Palaeobiology ==
Like other petrels, Pterodromoides would have been a seabird, flying out to sea in order to hunt fish and invertebrates, and it is believed to be a surface feeder which fed on prey that has been pushed towards the surface by currents or predators. It has been theorized that its rarity in the Yorktown Formation (being known from one specimen at the site) is due to taphonomic processes related to this surface feeding ecology. Based on the presence of Pterodromoides remains in both North Carolina and the Mediterranean, this bird is believed to have been widespread across the North Atlantic, and possibly a migratory species with wintering grounds which included the western North Atlantic.

== Palaeoenvironment ==
The fossils of Pterodromoides were first discovered at Punta Nati on the northwest coast of Menorca, one of the Balearic Islands of Spain. This site is believed to date back to the late Miocene and early Pliocene epochs based on the fossil assemblage. Remains of various animals are known from Punta Nati and these species would likely have been contemporaries of Pterodromoides. These include the tortoise Solitudo, the giant lagomorph Nuralagus, and the dormouse Muscardinus cyclopeus, as well as indeterminate lacertid lizards and bats. Other seabirds, including an undescribed fulmarine petrel more abundant than Pterodromoides, have been reported from the same sediments. Teeth of the fish Balistes crassidens, Sparus cinctus and Trigonodon oweni have also been found at Punta Nati, and would have lived in the seas surrounding the island.

Judging from the presence of this species and at least one other, even more abundant procellariiform, it is believed that the coast of Menorca had a zone of high marine productivity during the late Miocene and early Pliocene. This productivity level likely dropped in the late Pliocene based on how seabird remains became rare or absent, and seabird populations on Menorca today are still much lower than on the islands of Ibiza and Formentera, indicating a change in the Mediterranean current systems which may be related to tectonic processes.
