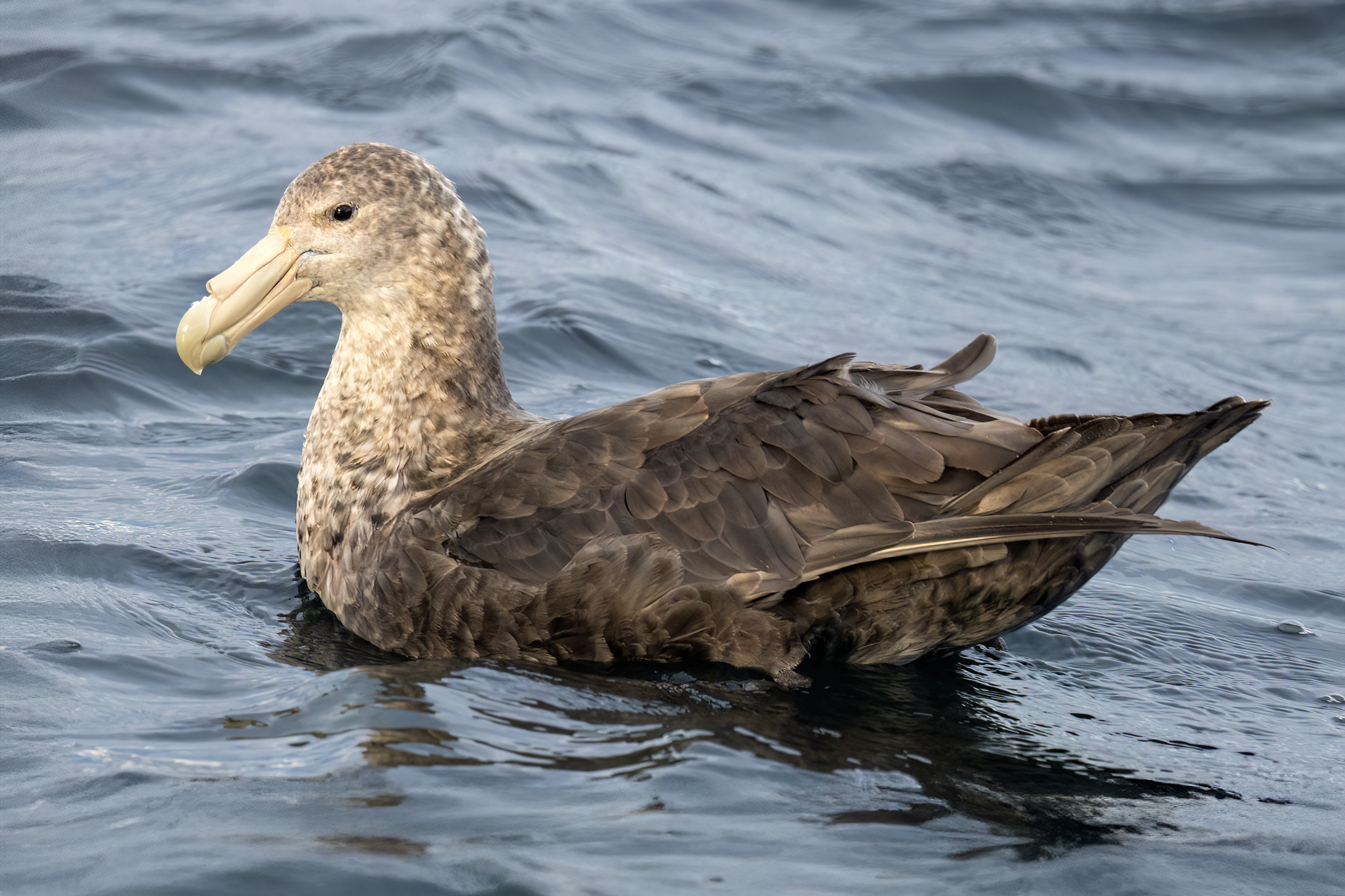
- Southern giant petrel, in the Strait of Magellan

Scientific classification
- Kingdom: Animalia
- Phylum: Chordata
- Class: Aves
- Order: Procellariiformes
- Family: Procellariidae
- Genus: Macronectes; Richmond, 1905

Type species
- Procellaria gigantea Gmelin, 1789

Species
- Macronectes giganteus Southern giant petrel Macronectes halli Northern giant petrel †Macronectes tinae Tina's giant petrel

= Giant petrel =

Giant petrel Temporal range: Pliocene – recent

Genus of birds

Giant petrels form a genus, Macronectes, from the family Procellariidae, which consists of two living and one extinct species. They are the largest birds in this family, and the only member that is capable of walking on land. The genus is almost entirely restricted to the Southern Hemisphere. Giant petrels are extremely aggressive predators and scavengers, inspiring another common name, the stinker. Seamen and whalers also referred to the giant petrel as the molly-hawk, gong, glutton bird and nelly.

== Description ==
The two extant species are difficult to tell from each other, possessing similar long, pale, orange bills and uniform, mottled grey plumage (except for around 15% of southern petrels, which are almost completely white). The billtip of M. halli is reddish-pink and that of M. giganteus is pale green, appearing slightly darker and lighter than the rest of the bill, respectively. The underside of older M. halli birds is paler and more uniform than M. giganteus, the latter showing a contrast between paler head and neck and darker belly. Additionally, adults of M. halli typically appear pale-eyed, while adults of M. giganteus of the normal morph typically appear dark-eyed (occasionally flecked paler). Classic examples of northern giant are identifiable at some range. Young birds of both species are all dark and very hard to distinguish unless bill tip colour can be seen. Some relatively young northern giant petrels can appear to be paler on the head, suggesting southern giant, thus this species is harder to confirm.

The southern giant petrel is slightly larger than the northern giant petrel, at 3 to 8 kg (6.6–17.6 lb), 180 to 210 cm (71–83 in) across the wings, and 86 to 100 cm (34–39 in) of body length. The northern giant petrel is 3 to 5 kg (6.6–11.0 lb), 150 to 210 cm (59–83 in) across the wings and 80 to 95 cm (31–37 in) of body length. The extinct Macronectes tinae is characterized by having smaller bodies than their living relatives.

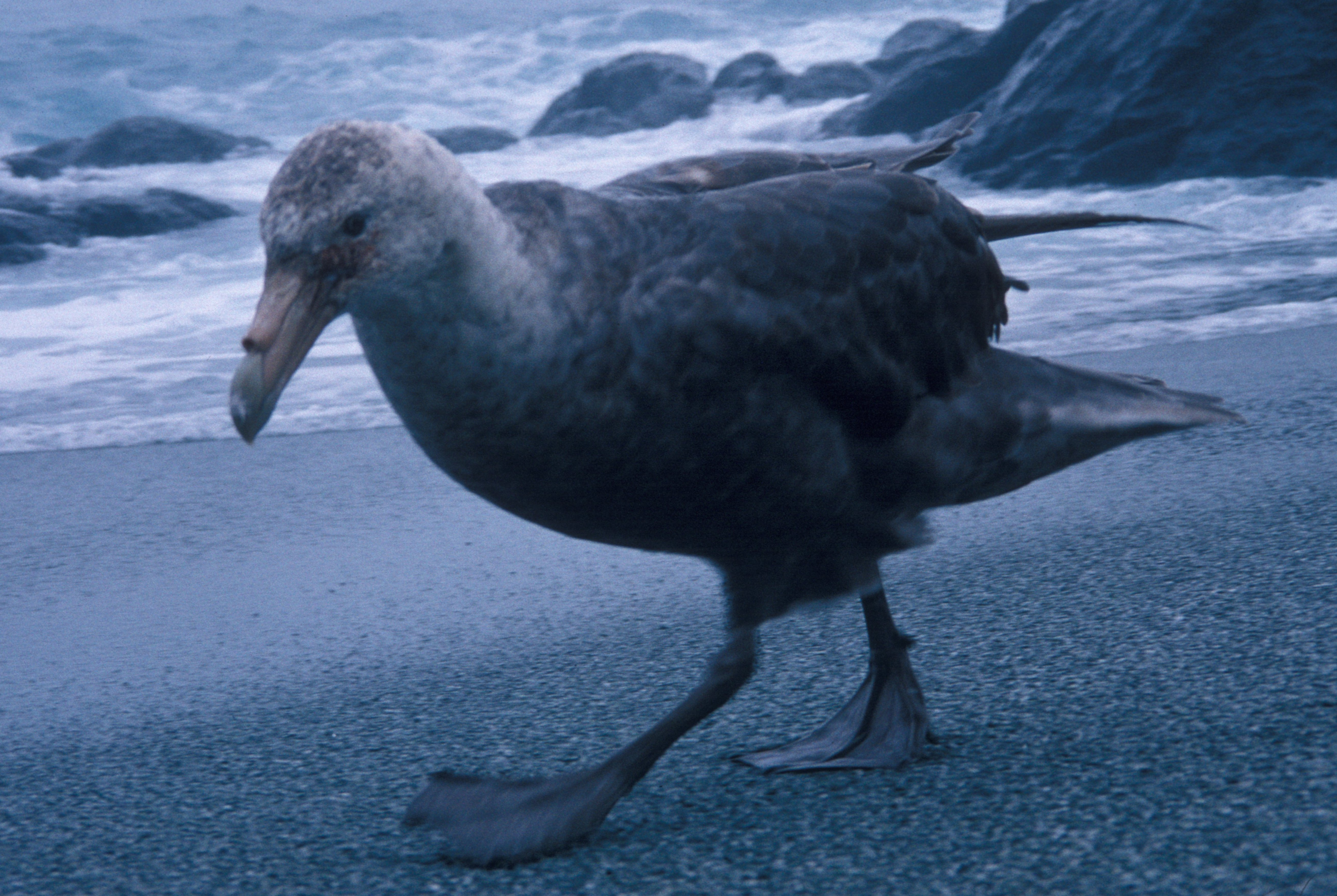
Giant petrels are capable walkers, unlike other petrels

They superficially resemble the albatross, and are the only procellarids that can equal them in size. They can be separated from the albatrosses by their bill; the two tube nostrils are joined on the top of the bill, unlike on albatross, where they are separated and on the side of the bill. Giant petrels are also the only members of the family Procellariidae to have strong legs to walk on land. They are also much darker and more mottled brown, except for the white morph southern, which is whiter than any albatross, and have a more hunch-backed look. The bills of Procellariiformes are also unique in that they are split into between seven and nine horny plates. The petrels have a hooked bill called the maxillary unguis which can hold slippery prey. They produce a stomach oil made up of wax esters and triglycerides which is stored in the proventriculus. This can be sprayed out of their mouths as a defense against predators and as a protein-rich food source for chicks and for the adults during their long flights. Petrels have a salt gland situated above the nasal passage that helps to desalinate their bodies by excreting a high saline solution from their noses.

== Taxonomy ==
The genus Macronectes was introduced in 1905 by the American ornithologist Charles Wallace Richmond to accommodate what is now the southern giant petrel. It replaced the previous genus Ossifraga which was found to have been earlier applied to a different group of birds.

The present-day giant petrels are two large seabirds from the genus Macronectes. Long considered to be conspecific, they were only established as separate species in 1966. The two species, the southern giant petrel, M. giganteus, and northern giant petrel, M. halli, are grouped with the two species of fulmars (Fulmarus) to form a distinct subgroup within the Procellariidae, which also includes the Antarctic petrel, Cape petrel, and snow petrel; these species form a separate group from the rest of the family.

A fossil giant petrel, Macronectes tinae, is known from the Pliocene epoch of New Zealand.

Genus Macronectes – Richmond, 1905 – three species
Common name	Scientific name and subspecies	Range	Size and ecology	IUCN status and estimated population
Southern giant petrel	Macronectes giganteus (Gmelin, 1789)	Antarctica to the subtropics of Chile, Africa, and Australia	Size: Habitat: Diet:	LC
Northern giant petrel	Macronectes halli Mathews, 1912	Southern Ocean north of the Antarctic Convergence Zone, and north through Chile, Argentina, South Africa, and half of Australia.	Size: Habitat: Diet:	LC
	Macronectes tinae (Tennyson & Salvador, 2023)	extinct (New Zealand, Pliocene)	Size: Habitat: Diet:	EX

== Etymology ==
The name Macronectes combines the Ancient Greek makros meaning "great" and nēktēs meaning "swimmer".

The name "Petrel", first recorded in 1602, is a corruption of pitteral, referring to the pitter-pattering across the water of the (distantly) related European storm petrel; the suggestion that the word refers to St Peter's walking on the waves is a later invention.

== Distribution ==
The living species are restricted to the Southern Hemisphere, and though their distributions overlap significantly, with both species breeding on the Prince Edward Islands, Crozet Islands, Kerguelen Islands, Macquarie Island, and South Georgia, many southern giant petrels nest farther south, with colonies as far south as Antarctica. In July 2019, an individual, either of M. giganteus or M. halli, was found as a vagrant in County Durham and Northumberland in the United Kingdom, marking the first record of the genus in Europe.

The extinct M. tinae is known from New Zealand, so the genus may have always been restricted to the Southern Hemisphere.

== Biology ==
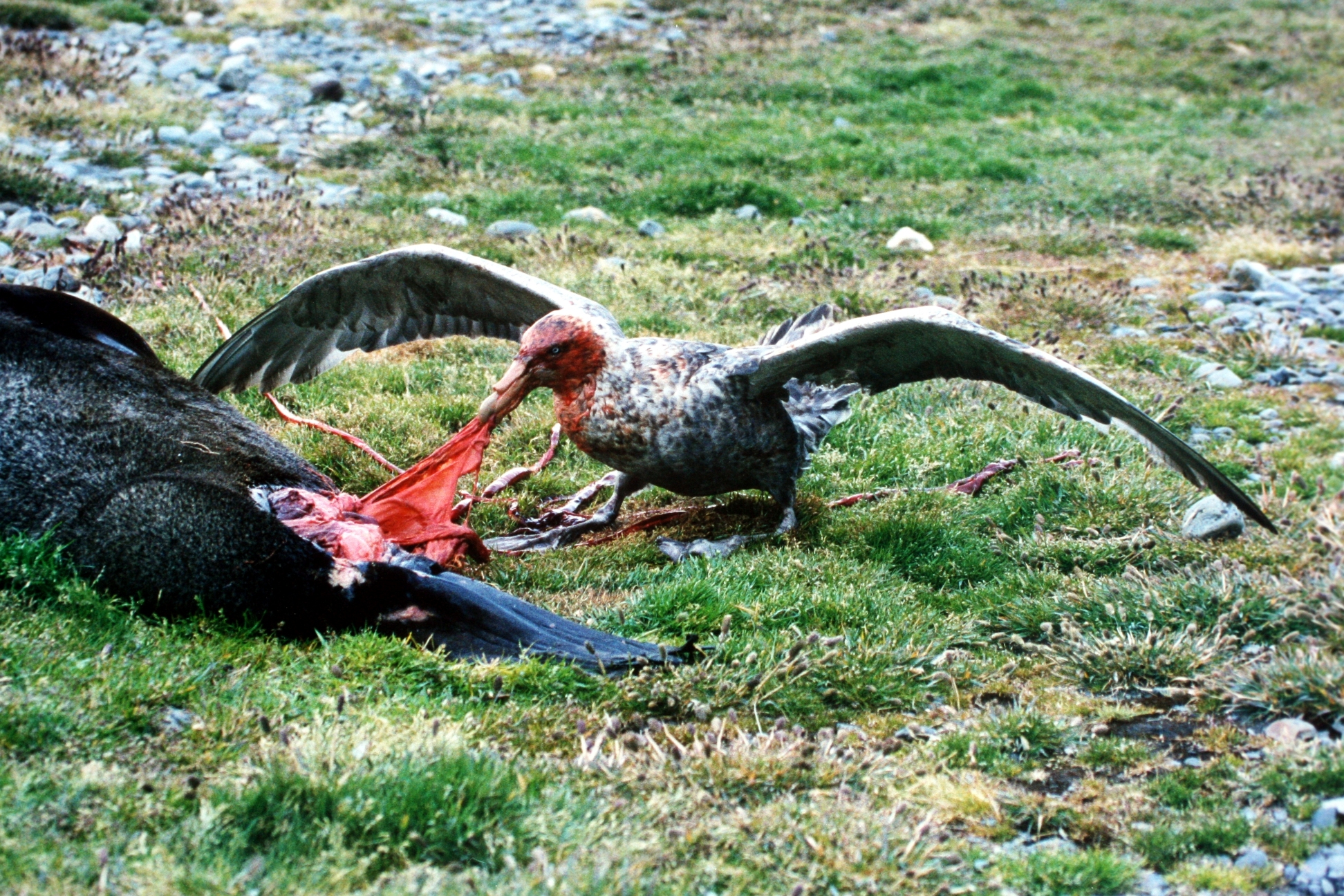
Giant petrel feeding on a seal carcass in South Georgia

Petrels are highly opportunistic feeders. Unique among procellarids, they will feed both on land and at sea; the majority of their food is found near coastlines. On land, they feed on carrion, and regularly scavenge the breeding colonies of penguins and seals. They will display their dominance over carcasses with a "sealmaster posture": the head and the wings are held outstretched, the head pointing at the opponent and the wingtips pointing slightly back; the tail is raised to a vertical position. Giant petrels are extremely aggressive and will kill other seabirds (usually penguin chicks, sick or injured adult penguins and the chicks of other seabirds), even those as large as an albatross, which they kill either by battering them to death or drowning.

At sea, they feed on krill, squid, and fish. They often follow fishing boats and other ships, in the hope of picking up offal and other waste.

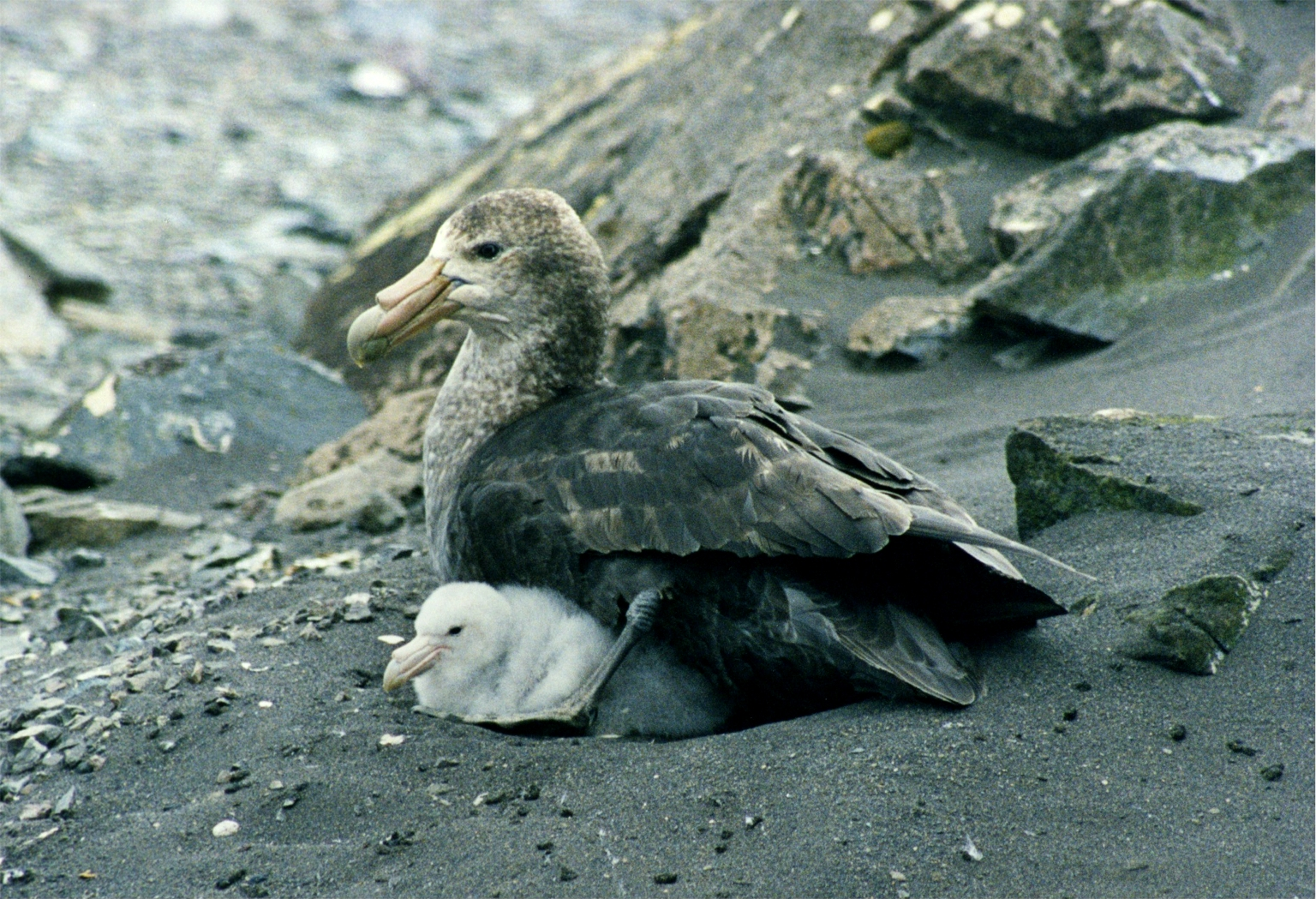
Giant petrel with chick in Antarctica

=== Reproduction ===
The southern giant petrel is more likely to form loose colonies than the northern, both species laying a single egg in a rough nest built about 50 cm (20 in) off the ground. The egg is incubated for about 60 days; once hatched the chick is brooded for three weeks. Chicks fledge after about four months, but do not achieve sexual maturity for six or seven years after fledging.

== Conservation ==
While both species were listed as near threatened in the 2008 IUCN Red List, subsequent evidence suggested they were less threatened than previously believed, and the populations of both actually appeared to have increased, at least locally. Consequently, they were listed as least concern on the 2009 Red List and afterwards (as of IUCN's last assessment in 2018, they continue to be listed as least concern).

The southern giant petrel is listed as endangered on the Australian Environment Protection and Biodiversity Conservation Act 1999, while the northern giant petrel is listed on the same act as vulnerable. Their conservation status also varies from state to state within Australia.

Conservation Status of Macronectes species in Australian States
State	Macronectes halli	Macronectes giganteus
NSW	Vulnerable	Endangered
QLD	Vulnerable	Endangered
SA	N/A	Vulnerable
TAS	Rare	Vulnerable
VIC	Endangered	Endangered

== Gallery ==
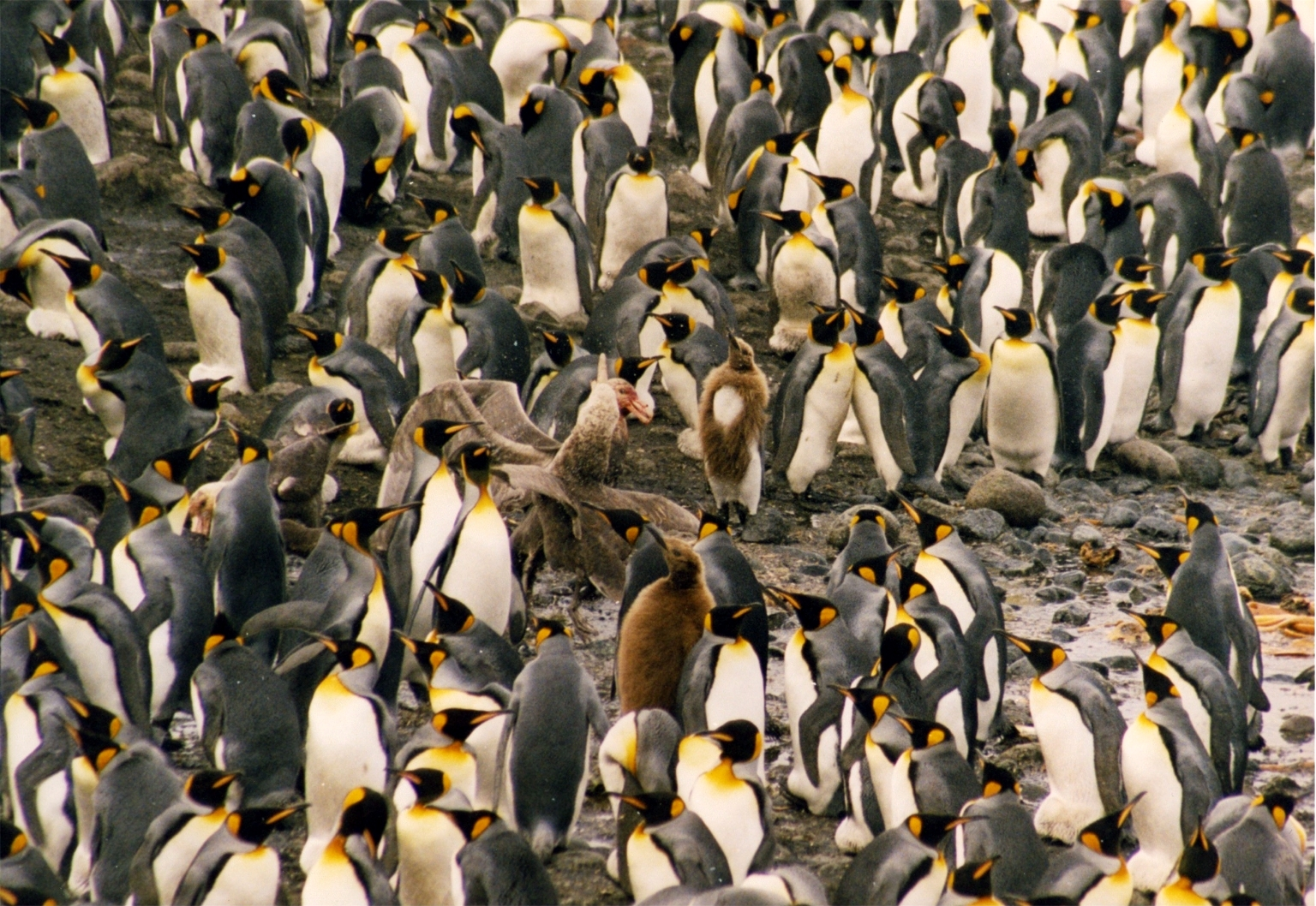
Giant petrel which has just killed a king penguin chick

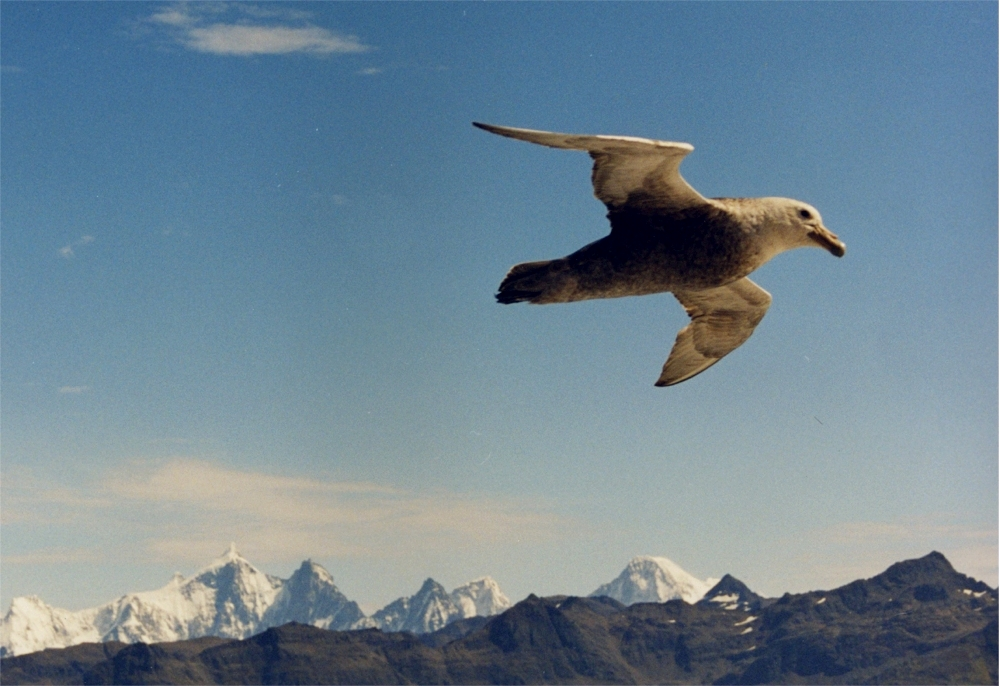
Giant petrel flying above South Georgia Island

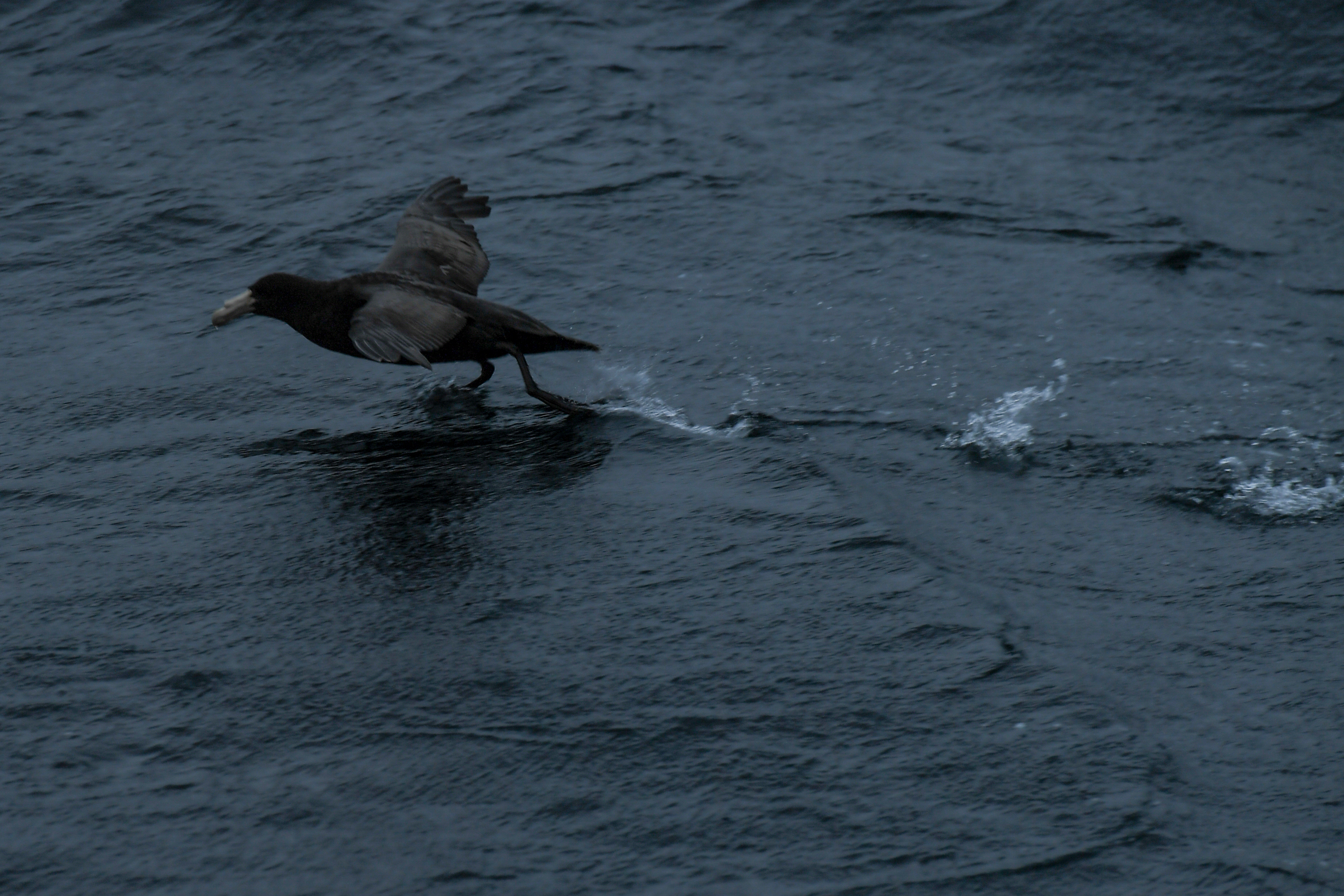
Giant petrel taking off from the water

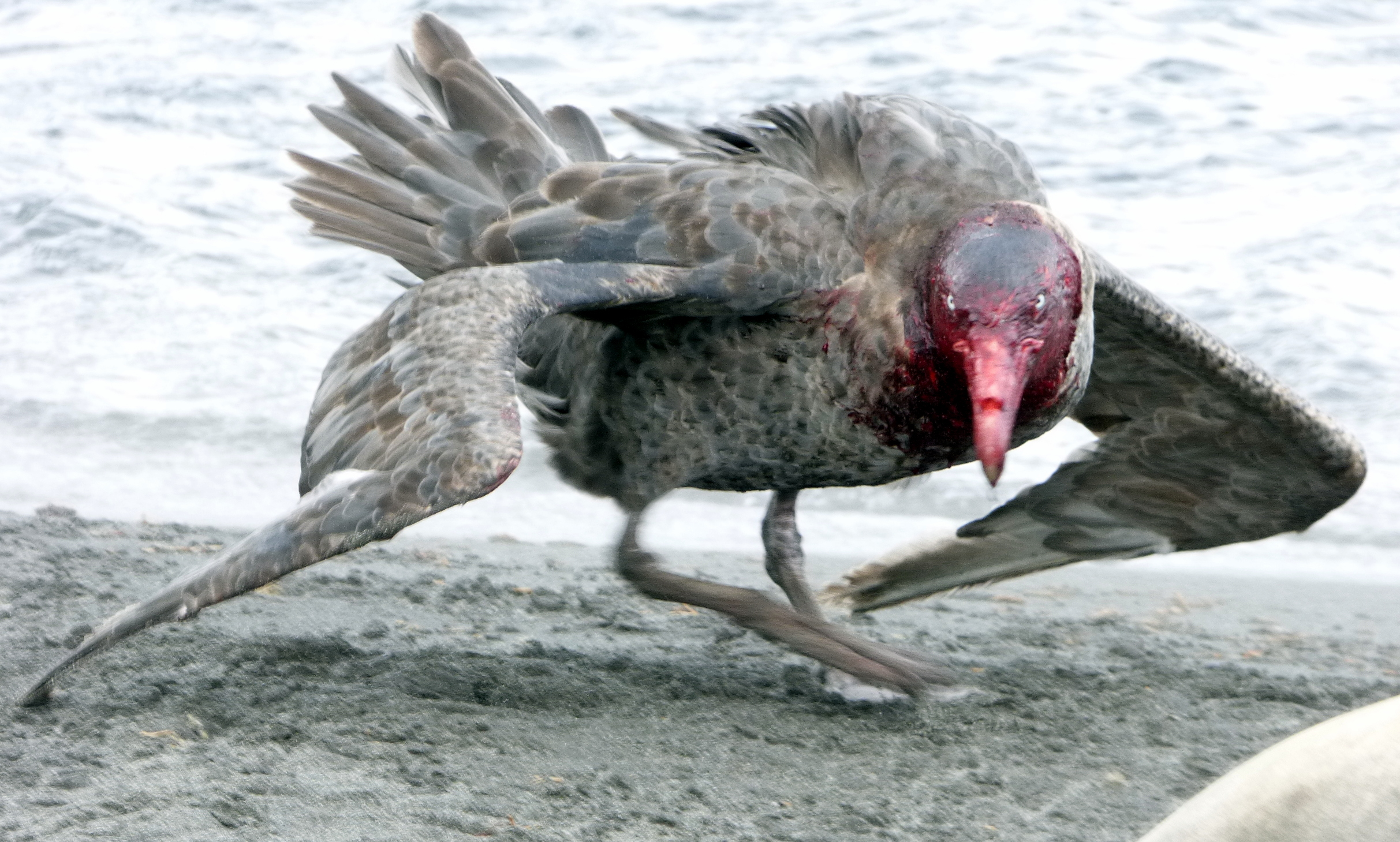
Giant petrel in a sealmaster pose

== Sources ==
- Brands, Sheila (14 Aug 2008). "Systema Naturae 2000 / Classification - Genus Macronectes -". Project: The Taxonomicon.
- Brooke, M. (2004). "Procellariidae". Albatrosses And Petrels Across The World. Oxford, UK: Oxford University Press. ISBN 0-19-850125-0.
- del Hoyo, Josep, Elliott, Andrew & Sargatal, Jordi (1992). Handbook of Birds of the World Vol 1. Barcelona:Lynx Edicions, ISBN 84-87334-10-5
