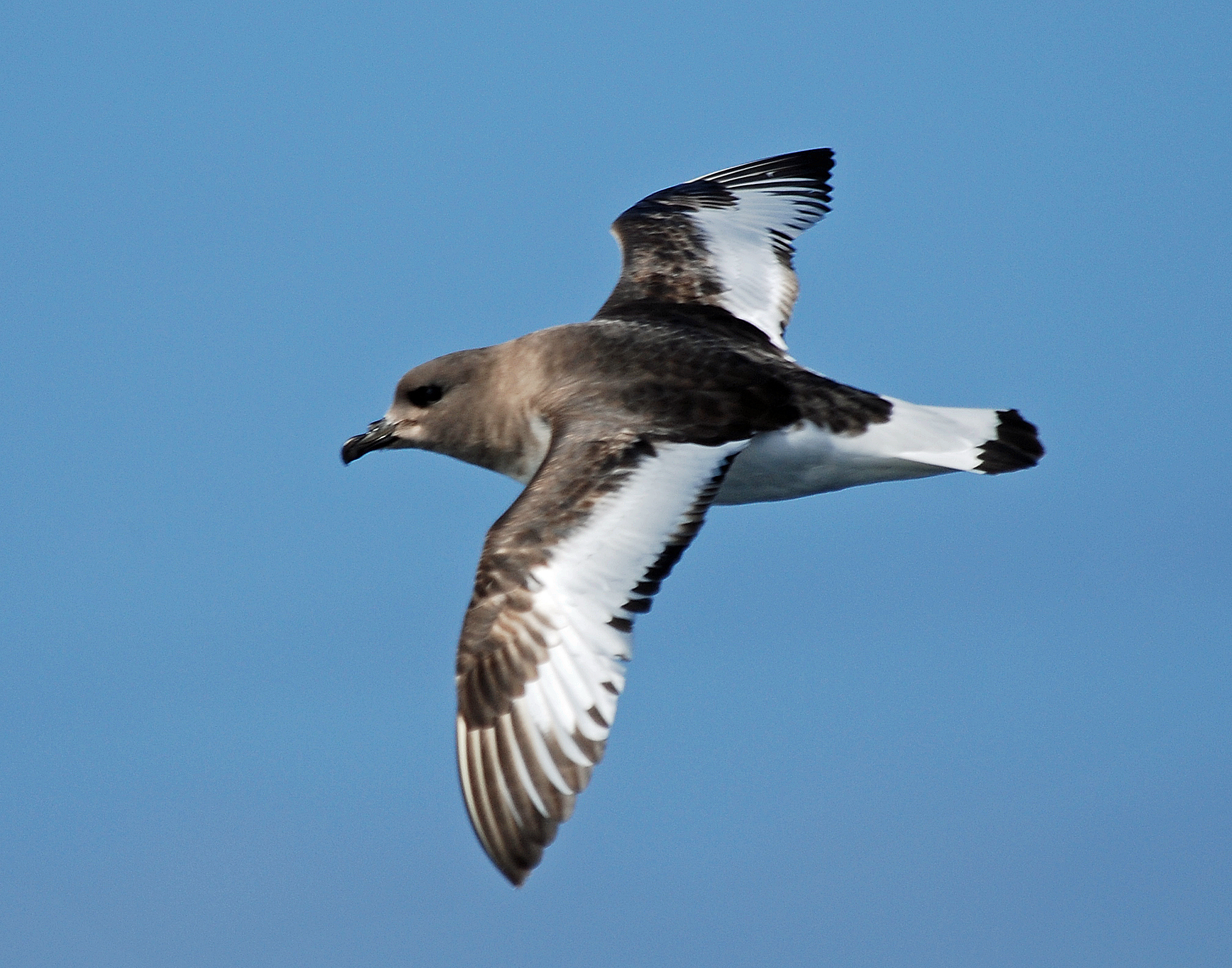

Conservation status
- Least Concern (IUCN 3.1)

Scientific classification
- Kingdom: Animalia
- Phylum: Chordata
- Class: Aves
- Order: Procellariiformes
- Family: Procellariidae
- Genus: Thalassoica; Reichenbach, 1853
- Species: T. antarctica

Binomial name
- Thalassoica antarctica (Gmelin, JF, 1789)
- range

= Antarctic petrel =

Species of bird

The Antarctic petrel (Thalassoica antarctica) is a boldly marked dark brown and white petrel, found in Antarctica, most commonly in the Ross and Weddell Seas. They eat Antarctic krill, fish, and small squid. They feed while swimming but can dive from both the surface and the air.

== Taxonomy and systematics ==
Captain James Cook saw the Antarctic petrel on his second voyage to the south Pacific. In 1773 both Cook and the naturalist Georg Forster mentioned the petrel in their separate accounts of the voyage. Forster wrote:

On the 17th, in the forenoon, we crossed the antarctic circle, and advanced into the southern frigid zone, which had hitherto remained impenetrable to all navigators. Some days before this period we had seen a new species of petrel, of a brown colour, with a white belly and rump, and a large white spot on the wings, which we now named the antarctic petrel, as we saw great flights of twenty on thirty of them hereabouts, of which we shot many that unfortunately never fell into the ship.

Based on these reports in 1783 the French polymath Georges-Louis Leclerc, Comte de Buffon included the petrel as "Le pétrel antarctique ou Damier brun" in his Histoire Naturelle des Oiseaux. The species was also included by John Latham in his A General Synopsis of Birds. When the German naturalist Johann Friedrich Gmelin updated Carl Linnaeus's Systema Naturae in 1789 he included a brief description of the Antarctic petrel, coined the binomial name Procellaria antarctica and cited the earlier authors. The Antarctic petrel is now the only species placed in the genus Thalassoica that was introduced in 1853 by the German naturalist Ludwig Reichenbach. The genus name combines the Ancient Greek thalassa meaning "sea" with oikos meaning "house". The species is monotypic: no subspecies are recognised. The word petrel is derived from St. Peter and the story of his walking on water. This is in reference to the petrel's habit of appearing to run on the water to take off.

The Antarctic petrel is placed in the family Procellariidae of the order Procellariiformes. This petrel along with the snow petrel, the Cape petrel, the giant petrels, and the fulmars, are considered to be a different subclade from the other Procellariidae members. They share certain identifying features. First, they have nasal passages that attach to the upper bill called naricorns. Although the nostrils on the petrels are on the top of the upper bill. The bills of Procellariiformes are also unique in that they are split into between seven and nine horny plates. On petrels, one of these plates forms the hooked portion of the upper bill. They produce a stomach oil made up of wax esters and triglycerides that is stored in the proventriculus. This can be sprayed out of their mouths as a defence against predators and as an energy rich food source for chicks and for the adults during their long flights. Finally, they also have a salt gland that is situated above the nasal passage and helps desalinate their bodies, due to the high amount of ocean water that they imbibe. It excretes a high saline solution from their nose.

== Description ==
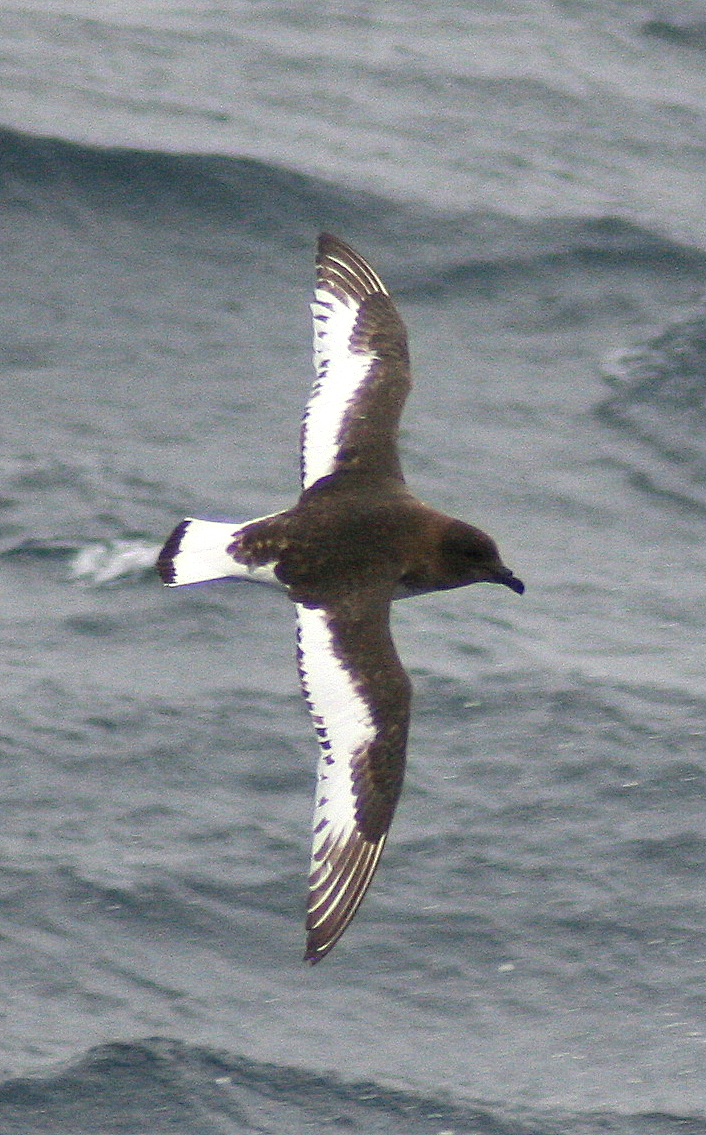
Antarctic petrel off of the Western Antarctic Peninsula

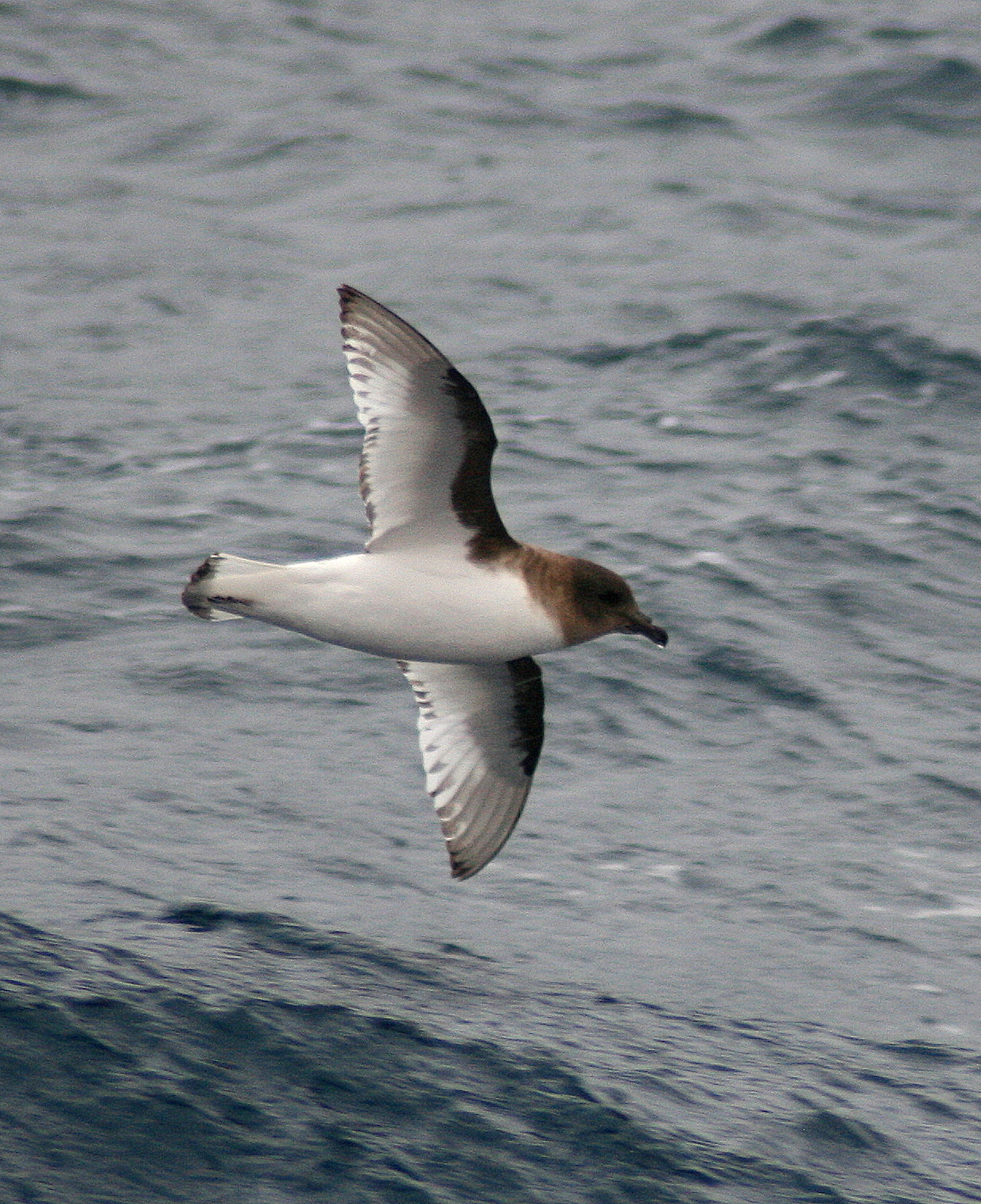

The adult Antarctic petrel has a brown head, sides, throat, and back. The bill is dark brown and the feet are grey. The underparts are white and their tail and secondaries on the wings are white with brown tips. These are medium-sized relative to other petrels with a wingspan of 100–110 cm (39–43 in), a length of 40–45 cm (16–18 in), and an average weight of 675 g (23.8 oz).

== Distribution and habitat ==
The Antarctic petrel, as its name implies, lives and breeds in the Southern Ocean, and on the Antarctic islands. They nest on snow-free cliffs and rock faces, on the coast or on offshore islands. However, they have been found up to 250 km inland. Another common roosting spot is icebergs. Breeding colonies during the October–November breeding period, can be as large as 200,000 pairs. However, the largest single colony ever observed, Mühlig-Hofmann Mountains, was estimated to be about one million Antarctic petrels, presumably including non-breeders and chicks.

They occasionally migrate to Australia or New Zealand in late winter. This tends to occur when they are caught in a bad storm.

== Behaviour ==
=== Food and feeding ===
The petrel's diet is mainly krill, squid and small fish. Food is usually seized when the bird is on the surface but they also plunge-dive to obtain food, diving up to a depth of 1.5 m (4 ft 11 in).

=== Breeding ===
The Antarctic petrel breeding period is during October–November. Each pair lays a single egg, which they incubate for 45–48 days after which there is a 42-47 day nestling period. Both members of the pair incubate the egg, 4% of pairs are female-female.

Eggs have a 70-90% hatching rate. The two main causes of egg loss were predation by South polar skuas, and an egg rolling out of the nest and freezing.

Antarctic petrel chicks rely on their parents for food as well as warmth. The physiological condition of the parent petrel dictates the amount of food it provides to its chick. Provisioning by parent petrels depends on both their own body condition and their chick's needs. Parent petrels in better body condition were more likely to have a chick that survived, and were able to increase the amount of food they gave to a smaller chick in a cross-fostering experiment. Chicks become thermally independent after day 11 post-hatching.

== Status ==
This petrel has an estimated occurrence range of 77,500,000 km^{2} (29,922,917 sq mi) and between 10 and 20 million adult birds. Due to its huge range and large numbers, it has been classified by the International Union for Conservation of Nature as a species of least concern.
