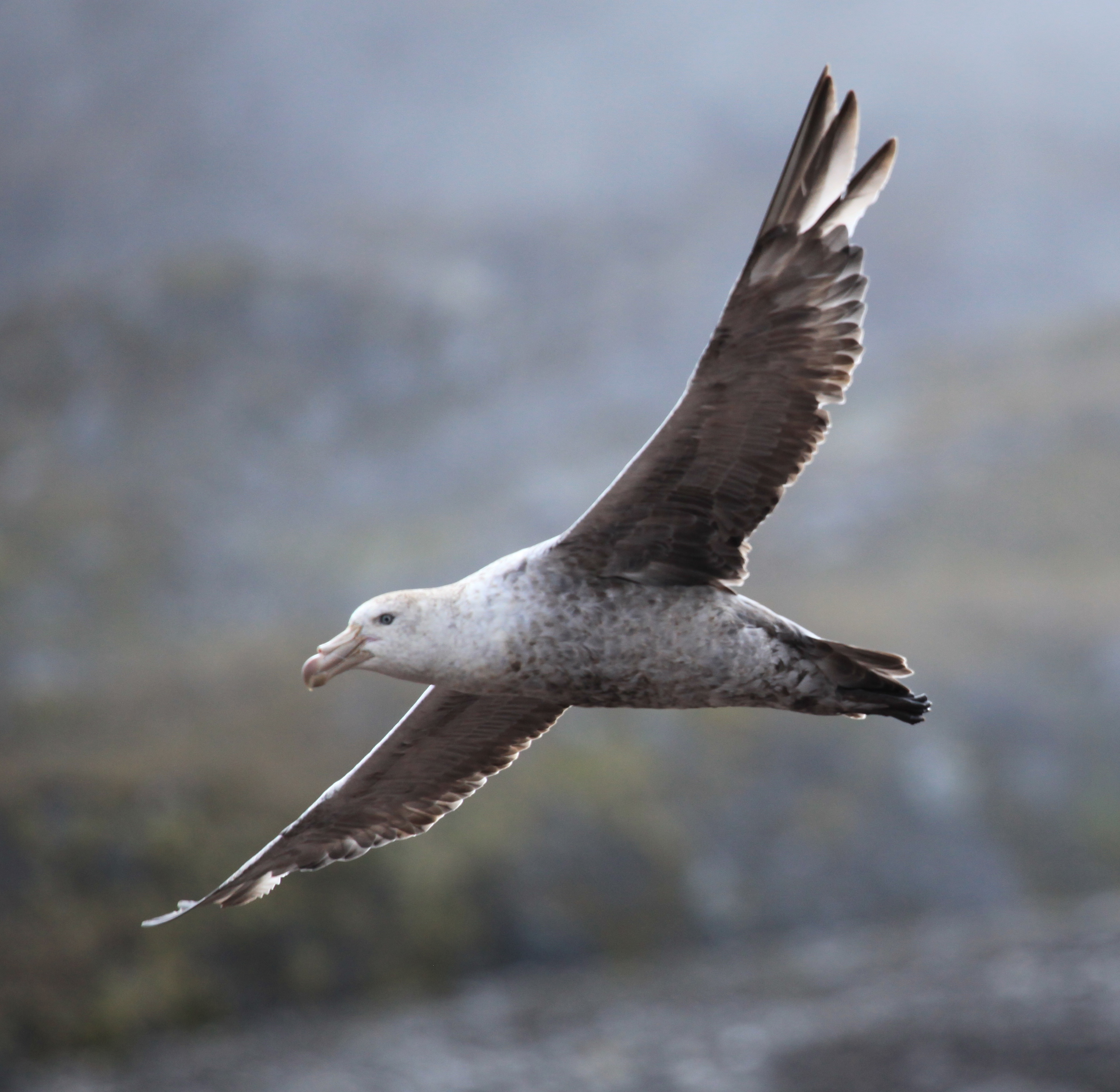
- Flying over Godthul, South Georgia, British Overseas Territories

Conservation status
- Least Concern (IUCN 3.1)

Scientific classification
- Kingdom: Animalia
- Phylum: Chordata
- Class: Aves
- Order: Procellariiformes
- Family: Procellariidae
- Genus: Macronectes
- Species: M. halli

Binomial name
- Macronectes halli Mathews, 1912
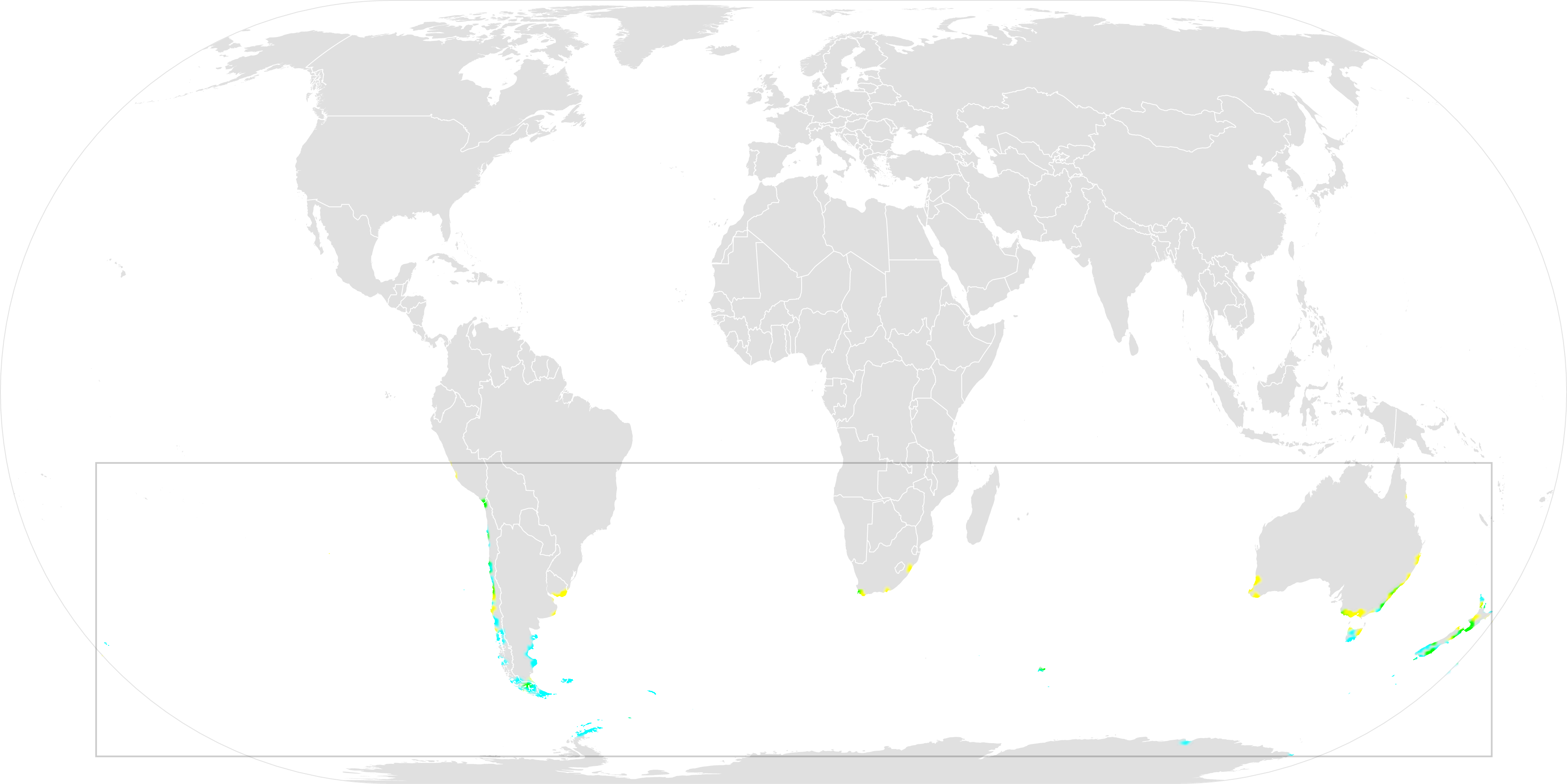
- Global map of eBird reports Year-Round Range Summer Range Winter Range

= Northern giant petrel =

Species of bird

The northern giant petrel (Macronectes halli), also known as Hall's giant petrel, is a large, predatory seabird of the southern oceans. Its range overlaps broadly with the range of the related southern giant petrel (Macronectes giganteus), albeit slightly further to the north.

== Taxonomy ==
The northern giant petrel was formally described in 1912 by the Australian born ornithologist Gregory Mathews as a subspecies of the southern giant petrel with the trinomial name Macronectes giganteus halli. The specific epithet halli was chosen to honour the Australian ornithologist Robert Hall who had described the birds breeding on the Kerguelen Islands. The northern giant petrel is now considered to be a separate species and has the binomial name Macronectes halli. It is monotypic: no subspecies are recognised. The genus name combines the Ancient Greek makros meaning "great" and nēktēs meaning "swimmer". The name "petrel" refers to the Biblical account of Saint Peter walking on water, referring to the way these birds run on top of the water as they are getting airborne.

The two giant petrel species make up the genus Macronectes. They belong to the order Procellariiformes, the tube-nosed seabirds or petrels. All tube-noses have tubular nostrils, and all those in the family Procellariidae, the true petrels, have their nostrils united along the top of the bill. Procellariform birds have between seven and nine distinct horny plates for their bill, and in petrels one of these plates forms the hooked portion of their upper bill called the maxillary unguis. They produce a stomach oil made up of wax esters and triglycerides that is stored in the proventriculus. This can be sprayed out of their mouths as a defence against predators as well as an energy rich food source for chicks and for the adults during their long flights. Finally, they also have a salt gland that is situated above the nasal passage and helps desalinate their bodies, due to the high amount of sea water that they imbibe. It excretes a concentrated saline solution from their nostrils.

== Description ==
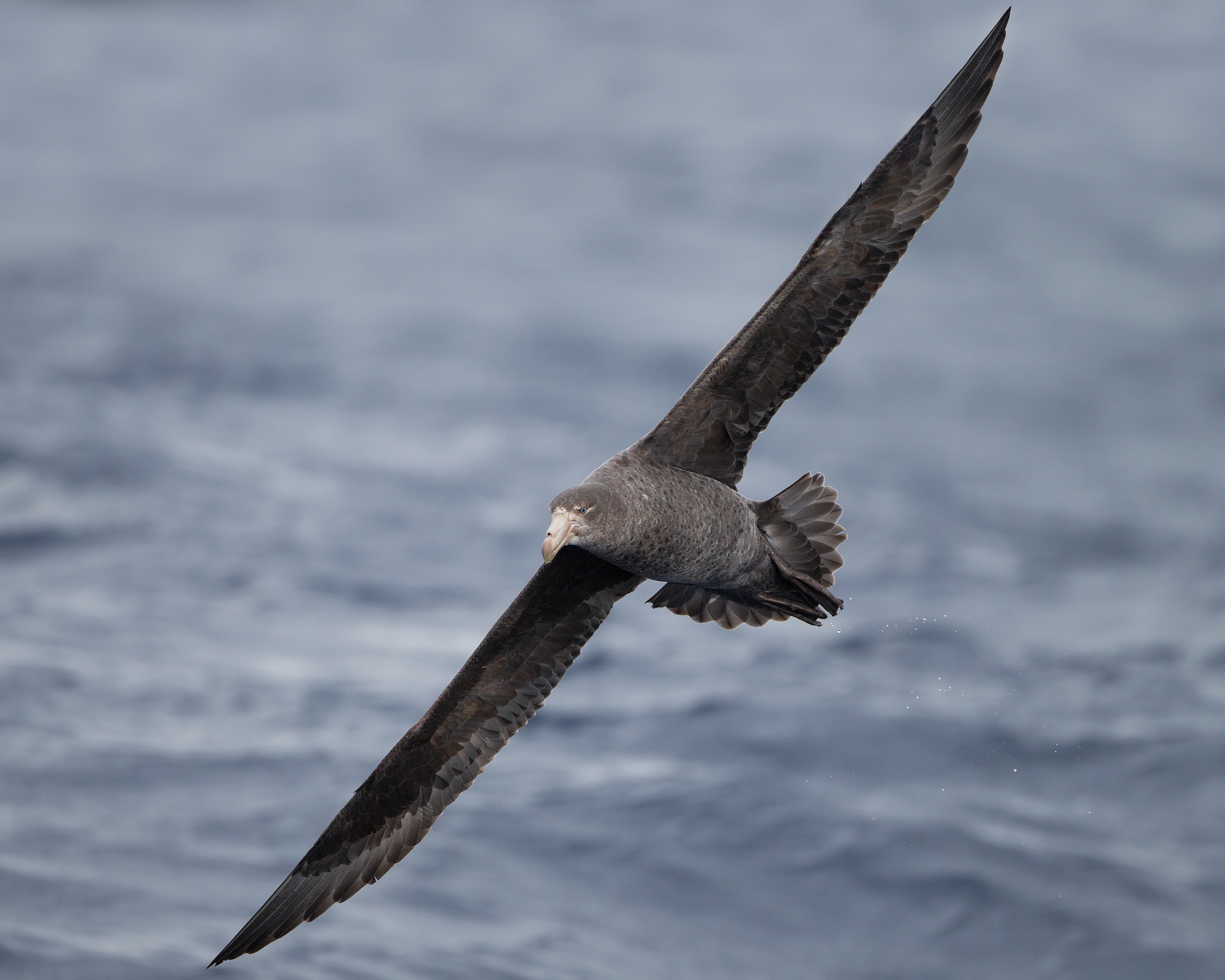
Immature northern giant petrel in flight

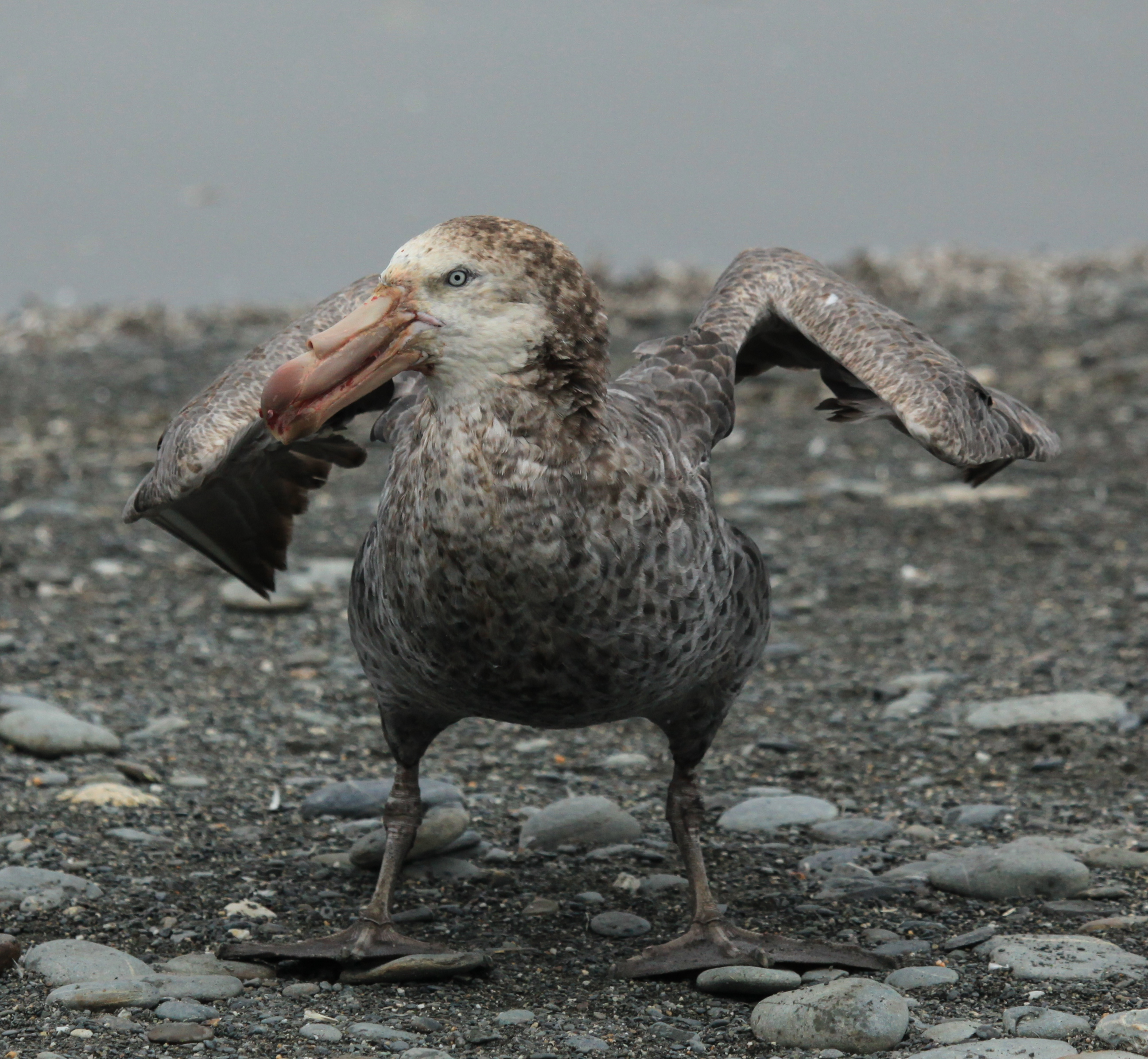
On Salisbury Plain, South Georgia, British Overseas Territories

The northern giant petrel averages 90 cm (35 in) in length, with a range of 80 to 95 cm (31 to 37 in), possessing a wingspan of 150 to 210 cm (59 to 83 in). Size is somewhat variable and this species is broadly the same size as its southern sister species. The largest-bodied colony is in the South Georgia Islands, where 56 males averaged 4.9 kg (11 lb) and 43 females average 3.72 kg (8.2 lb). The smallest-bodied are on the Chatham Islands, where 19 males averaged 3.66 kg (8.1 lb) and 21 females averaged 2.83 kg (6.2 lb). Overall, weight for the species can range from 2.5 to 5.8 kg (5.5 to 12.8 lb). Its plumage consists of grey-brown body with lighter coloured forehead, sides of face, and chin. Its bill is between 90 and 110 mm (3.5–4.3 in) long, slightly longer on average than the southern giant petrel, and is pinkish yellow with a brown tip. Its eyes are grey. The tarsus of the northern giant petrel is slightly longer on average than the southern species, but the southern has longer wings on average. The juvenile Macronectes halli is entirely dark brown and lightens as it ages. It can be differentiated from Macronectes giganteus by the top of the bill, which on the southern species is green.

== Distribution and habitat ==
The northern giant petrel is pelagic and is found throughout the Southern Ocean north of the Antarctic Convergence Zone, and north through Chile, Argentina, South Africa, New Zealand, and half of Australia. Over 4,500 pairs nest on islands in the South Georgia group. They also nest on some of the Chatham Islands, Kerguelen Islands, Crozet Islands, Macquarie Island and others. Their overall range is 82,600,000 km^{2} (31,900,000 sq mi).

== Behaviour ==
=== Feeding ===
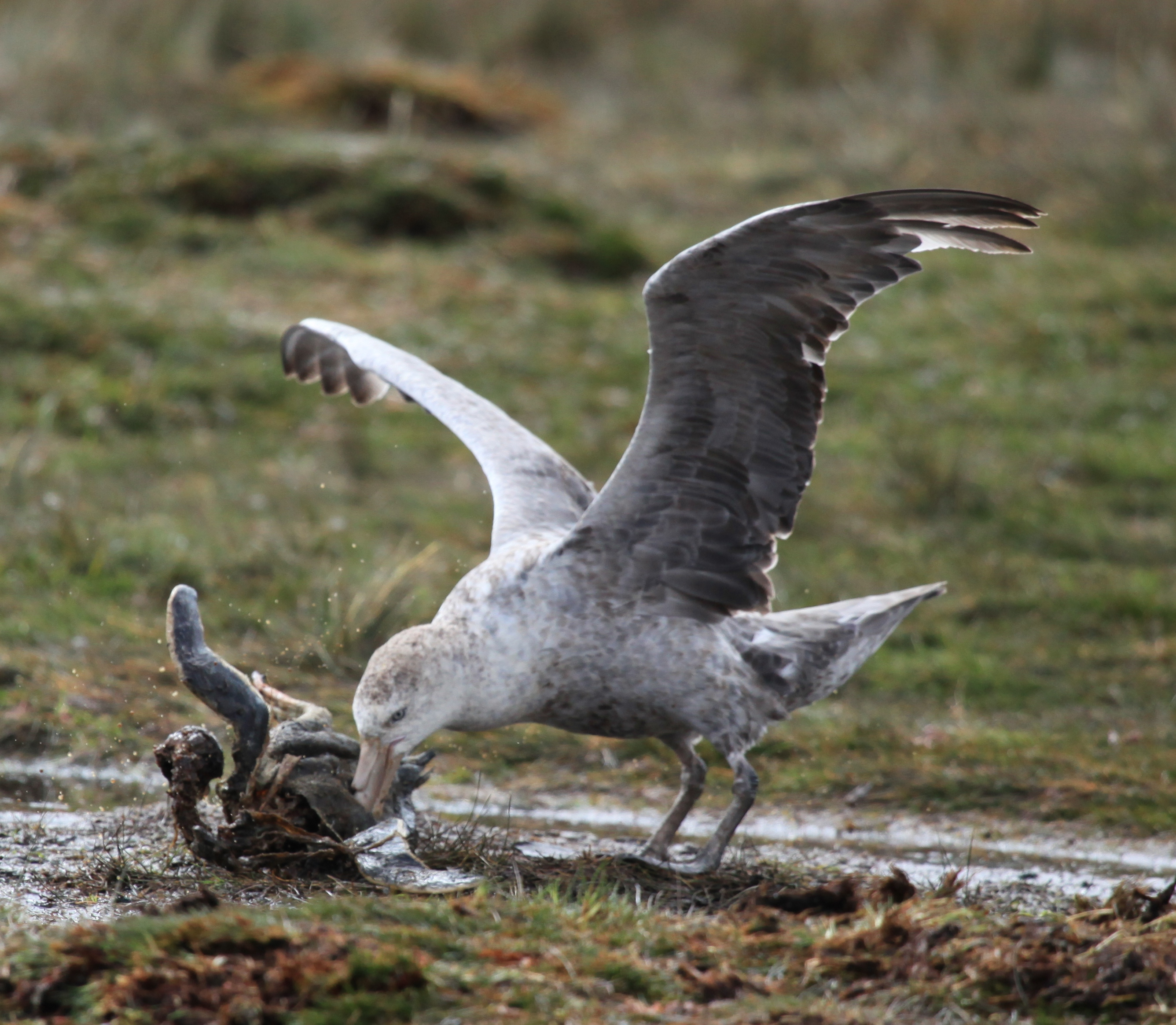
A northern giant petrel picking a penguin carcass at Godthul, South Georgia

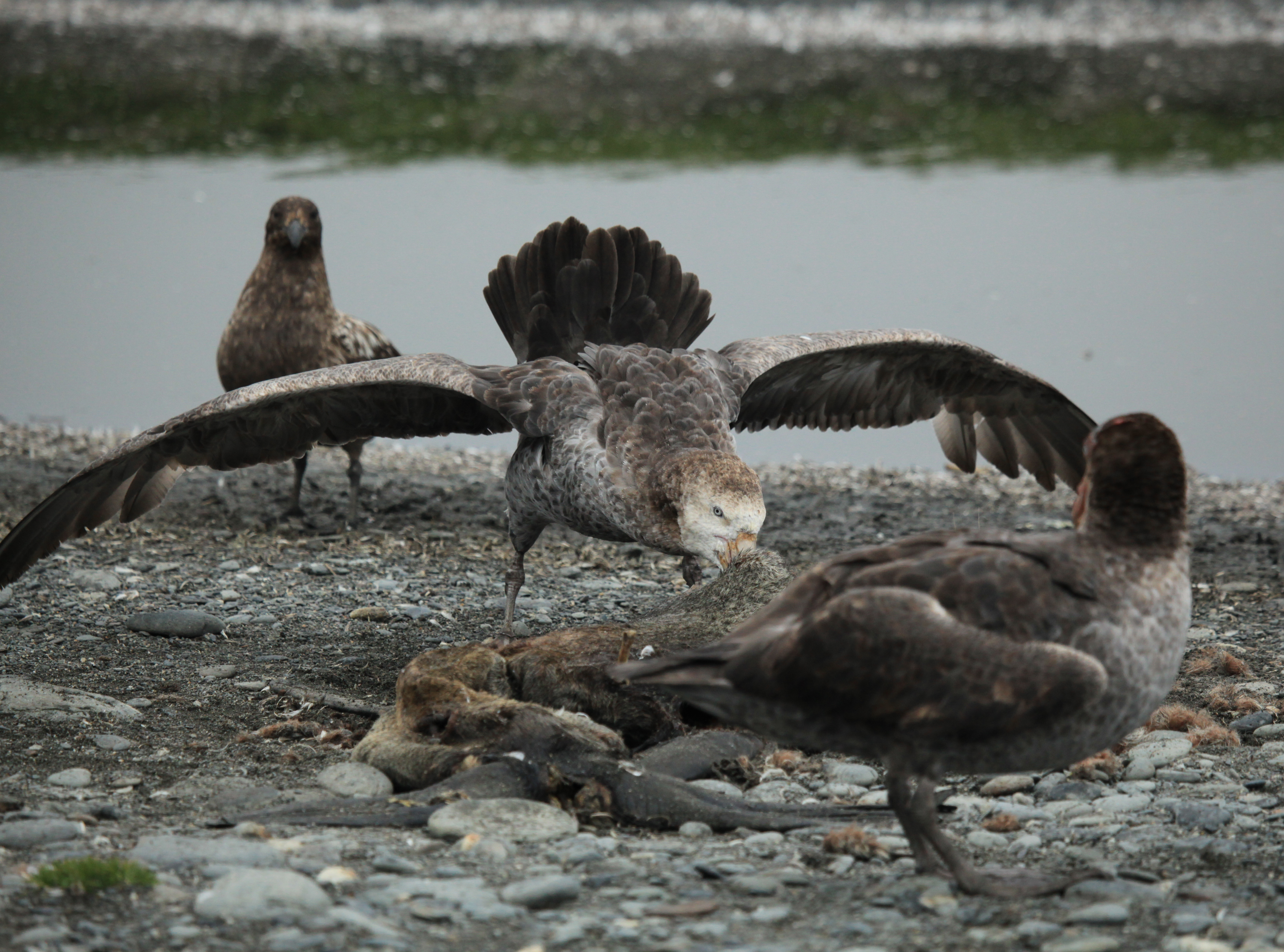
Two giant petrels eating a fur seal carcass at Salisbury Plain, South Georgia. In the rear is a brown skua.

The northern giant petrel feeds mainly on carrion (dead penguins and pinnipeds), as well as fish, krill, squid, and other cephalopods. They will follow fishing boats and cruise ships, eating any discarded fish and waste from the ships. During the breeding season, males eat more carrion than females, with the females feeding on pelagic sources. They are extremely aggressive and will kill other seabirds (mostly penguin chicks, sick or injured adult penguins and the chicks of other seabirds), even those as large as an albatross.

Northern giant petrels forage in similar locations to southern giant petrels, but at different times due to the earlier breeding season of northern giant petrels. It is thought this temporal segregation in habitat-use reduces interspecific competition, whilst sexual segregation, due to females making more pelagic trips than males, reduces intraspecific competition.

=== Breeding ===
Birds start breeding at an average age of ten years, and breed on islands in colonies, which they share with the southern giant petrel. They breed six weeks earlier than their counterparts.

== Conservation ==
Breeding population and trends
| Location | Population | Date | Trend |
|---|---|---|---|
| South Georgia | 4,500 pairs | 2005 | Increasing 30% per 20 yr |
| Forty-Fours | 2,000 pairs | 2000 | |
| Middle Sister | 80–100 pairs | 2000 | |
| Kerguelen Islands | 1,450–1,800 pairs | 1989 | |
| Crozet Islands | 1,300 pairs | 1989 | Decreasing |
| Macquarie Island | 1,300 pairs | | Stable or increasing |
| Prince Edward Islands | 650 pairs | | Increasing |
| Antipodes Island | 230 pairs | 2003 | |
| Campbell Island | 230 pairs | 2000 | |
| Auckland Islands | 50 pairs | 2000 | |
| Total | 17,000–21,000 | 2001 | Increasing 34% per 10 yr |

In a 2001 estimate, this species had between 17,000 and 21,000 mature birds. This number has been increasing over the last two decades, after being expected to decrease. The IUCN thus downgraded them from near threatened to least concern. Recent surveys have shown that most locations are increasing in numbers, except for the Crozet Islands. This is probably due to increases in fish waste, better control on longline fishing, and more carrion from fur seals.

Currently, this bird is listed on CMS Appendix II and ACAP Annex 1. Future plans are to maintain surveys and counting of individuals, research movement and migration, and continue lowering the bycatch deaths by current means and if needed newer measures through CCAMLR, CMS, and FAO.

== Sources ==
- BirdLife International (2009). "Northern Giant-petrel – BirdLife Species Factsheet". Data Zone.
- Brooke, M. (2004). "Procellariidae". Albatrosses And Petrels Across The World. Oxford, UK: Oxford University Press. ISBN 0-19-850125-0.
- Double, M. C. (2003). "Procellariiformes (Tubenosed Seabirds)". In Hutchins, Michael; Jackson, Jerome A.; Bock, Walter J.; Olendorf, Donna (eds.). Grzimek's Animal Life Encyclopedia. Vol. 8 Birds I Tinamous and Ratites to Hoatzins. Joseph E. Trumpey, Chief Scientific Illustrator (2nd ed.). Farmington Hills, MI: Gale Group. pp. 107–111. ISBN 0-7876-5784-0.
- Ehrlich, Paul R.; Dobkin, David, S.; Wheye, Darryl (1988). The Birders Handbook (First ed.). New York, NY: Simon & Schuster. pp. 29–31. ISBN 0-671-65989-8.
- Gotch, A. F. (1995) [1979]. "Albatrosses, Fulmars, Shearwaters, and Petrels". Latin Names Explained A Guide to the Scientific Classifications of Reptiles, Birds & Mammals. New York, NY: Facts on File. p. 190. ISBN 0-8160-3377-3.
