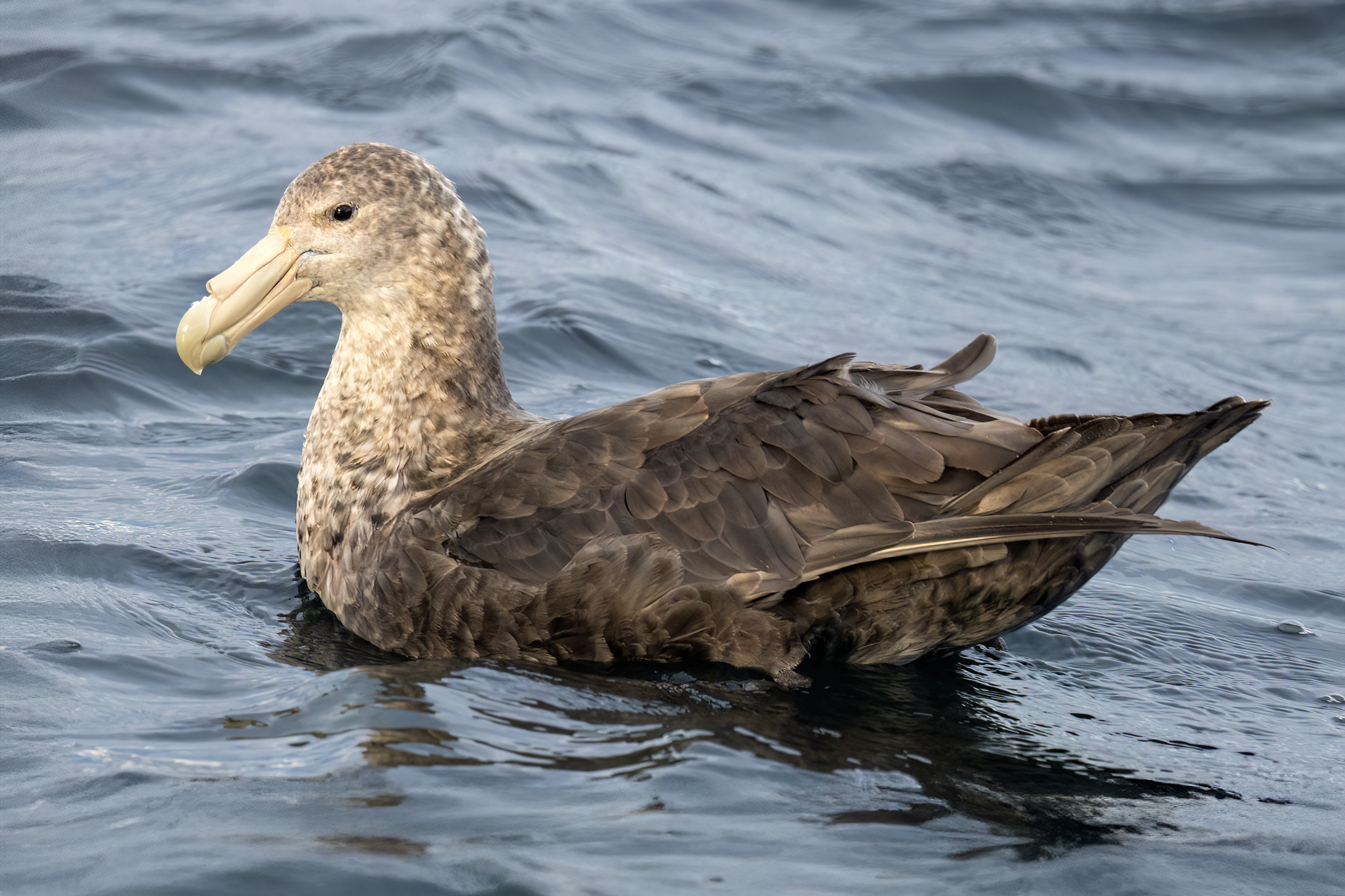

Conservation status
- Least Concern (IUCN 3.1)

Scientific classification
- Kingdom: Animalia
- Phylum: Chordata
- Class: Aves
- Order: Procellariiformes
- Family: Procellariidae
- Genus: Macronectes
- Species: M. giganteus

Binomial name
- Macronectes giganteus (Gmelin, 1789)
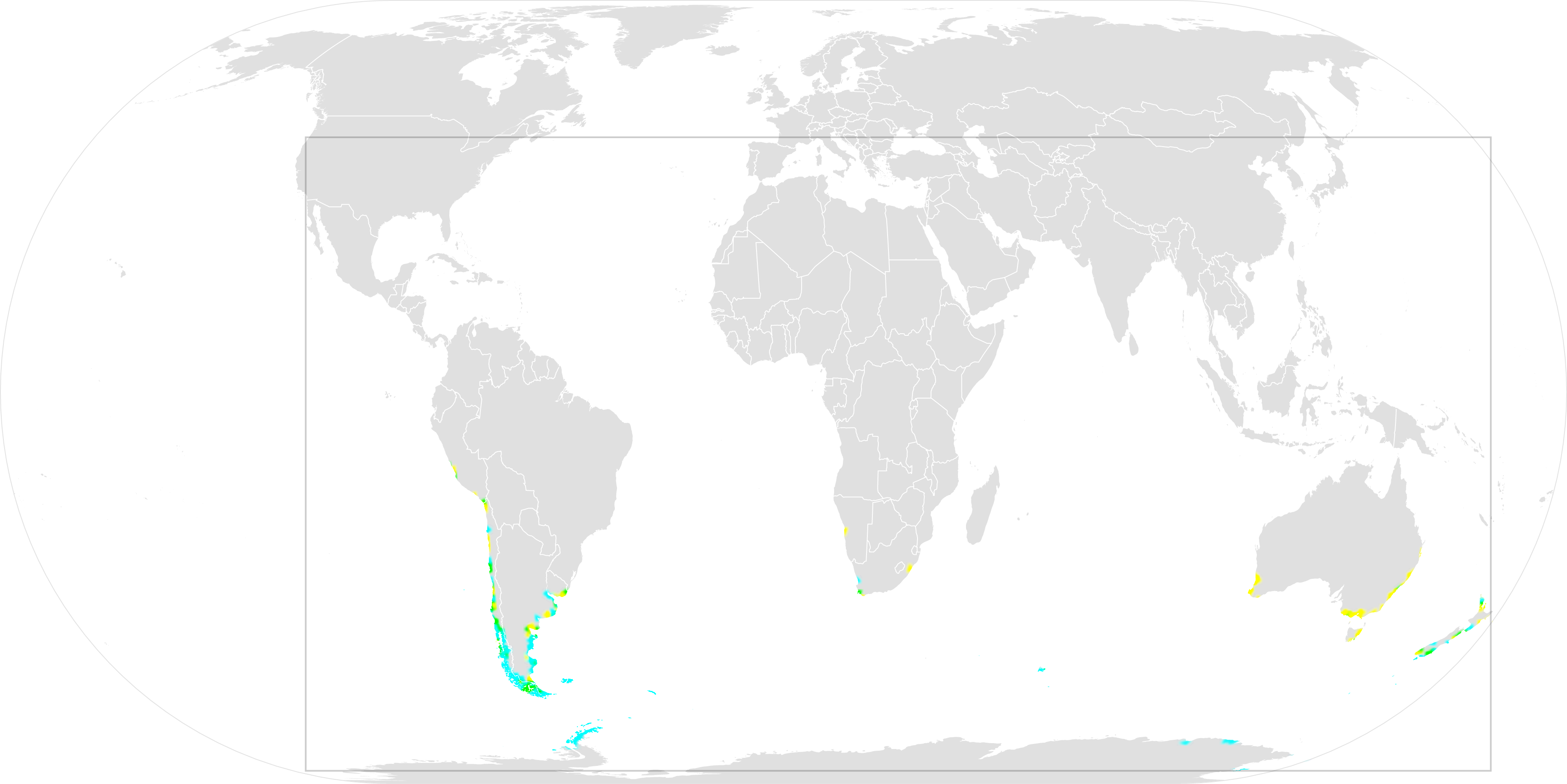
- Global map of eBird reports Year-Round Range Summer Range Winter Range

= Southern giant petrel =

Species of bird

The southern giant petrel (Macronectes giganteus), also known as the Antarctic giant petrel, giant fulmar, stinker, and stinkpot, is a large seabird of the southern oceans. Its distribution overlaps broadly with the similar northern giant petrel, though it overall is centered slightly further south. Adults of the two species can be distinguished by the colour of their bill-tip: greenish in the southern and reddish in the northern.

== Taxonomy ==
The southern giant petrel was formally described in 1789 by the German naturalist Johann Friedrich Gmelin. He placed it with all the other petrels in the genus Procellaria and coined the binomial name Procellaria gigantea. Gmelin cited the "giant petrel" that had been described and illustrated in 1785 by the English ornithologist John Latham in his A General Synopsis of Birds.

The southern giant petrel is now placed with the northern giant petrel in the genus Macronectes that was introduced in 1905 by the American ornithologist Charles Wallace Richmond. The genus name Macronectes combines the Ancient Greek makros meaning "great" and nēktēs meaning "swimmer". The specific epithet giganteus is Latin, derived from Greek "gigas", and means "gigantic". The species is monotypic: no subspecies are recognised.

== Description ==
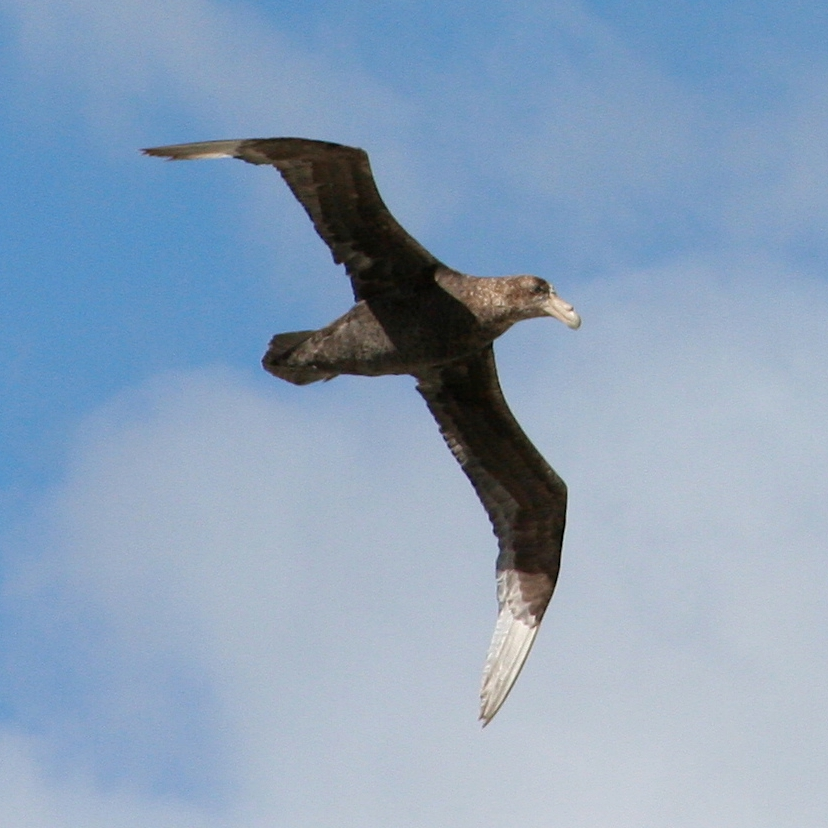
Flying over East Falkland

The southern giant petrel measures 86 to 99 cm (34–39 in) with a wingspan of 185 to 205 cm (6 ft 1 in – 6 ft 9 in). Both this and the northern giant petrel vary considerably in size, with southern colonies averaging larger than northern colonies, in line with Bergmann's rule. Due to the large amount of size variability, it is difficult to determine which is the larger species, but the largest-bodied colonies of the southern species are slightly larger on average, in both mass and linear dimensions, than the largest Northern giant petrels.

The males tend to be larger but, body mass can vary widely, from 2.3 to 5.6 kg (5.1–12.3 lb), with males averaging larger than females. The largest average weights come from Macquarie Island, where 20 males averaged 5.14 kg (11.3 lb) and 21 females averaged 4.2 kg (9.3 lb). On the South Orkney Islands, 37 males averaged 4.94 kg (10.9 lb) and 37 females averaged 3.85 kg (8.5 lb). In contrast, in Patagonia, 15 males averaged 3.5 kg (7.7 lb) and 21 females averaged 2.5 kg (5.5 lb). However another study from Patagonia, found that 26 males averaged 4.2 kg (9.3 lb) and 27 females averaged 3.7 kg (8.2 lb). They have a very large yellow bill, with a green tip and greyish-brown legs.

There are two different morphs, the dark which resembles the northern giant petrel, and the more distinct light morph. On the dark morph the upper breast, head and neck are light with the remainder of its plumage being mottled brown. The leading edge of its wing is lighter as is the base of the inner primaries, on the underside. The light morph is rarer and very distinct with only slight black speckles on an otherwise all white look. As juveniles, the dark morph starts off more sooty brown and pales as it ages. Both giant petrels have strong legs and can move around on land effectively. Finally, when in flight this species has a somewhat hunchbacked appearance.

It, like all members of the Procellariiformes, have features that set them apart from other birds. First, they have nasal passages called naricorns, that attach to the upper bill. The nose holes on the petrels are on the top of the bill. The bills of all Procellariiformes are also unique in that they are split into between seven and nine horny plates. They produce a stomach oil made up of wax esters and triglycerides that is stored in the proventriculus. This can be sprayed out of their mouths as a defence against predators and used as an energy rich food source for chicks and for the adults during their long flights. Above the nasal passage they have a salt gland, which helps to remove salt from their blood; this salt, primarily sodium chloride, is in their marine invertebrate food and in the large amount of ocean water that they imbibe; it excretes a concentrated salt solution from the nostrils.

== Distribution and habitat ==
The range of this bird is quite large as it ranges from Antarctica to the subtropics of Chile, Africa, and Australia, It breeds on numerous islands throughout the southern oceans. The islands with larger populations include the Foveaux Strait, Falkland Islands, South Georgia, South Orkney Islands, Staten Island, South Shetland, Heard Island, Macquarie Island, the Prince Edward Islands, and the Crozet Islands. The other locations with small populations are the Kerguelen Islands, Gough Island, Tristan da Cunha, Diego Ramirez, Isla Noir as well as four locations on the continent of Antarctica, including Terre Adélie, and small islands off the coast of Argentina near Chubut Province. The colonies are visited year round.

== Behaviour ==
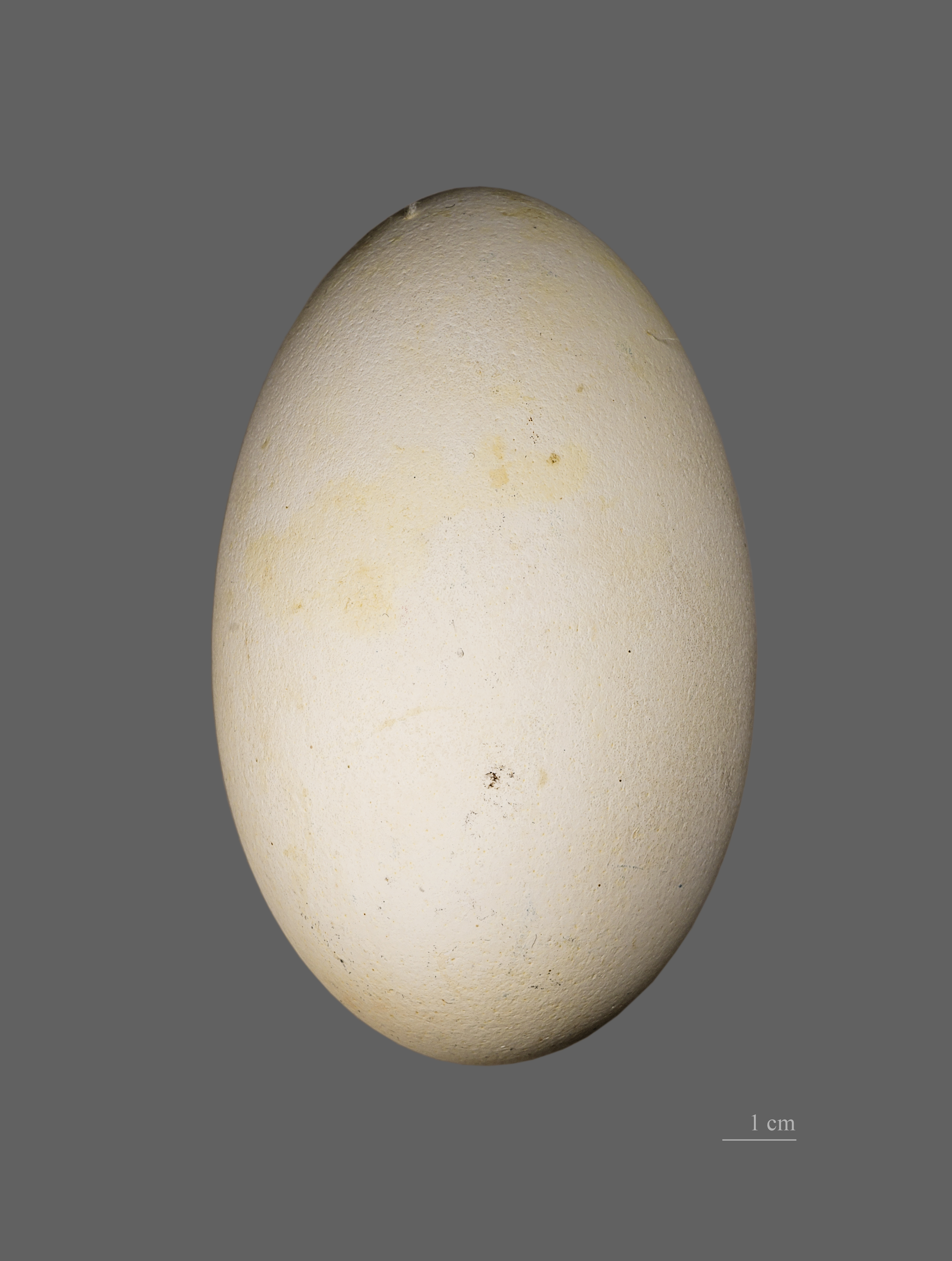
Egg

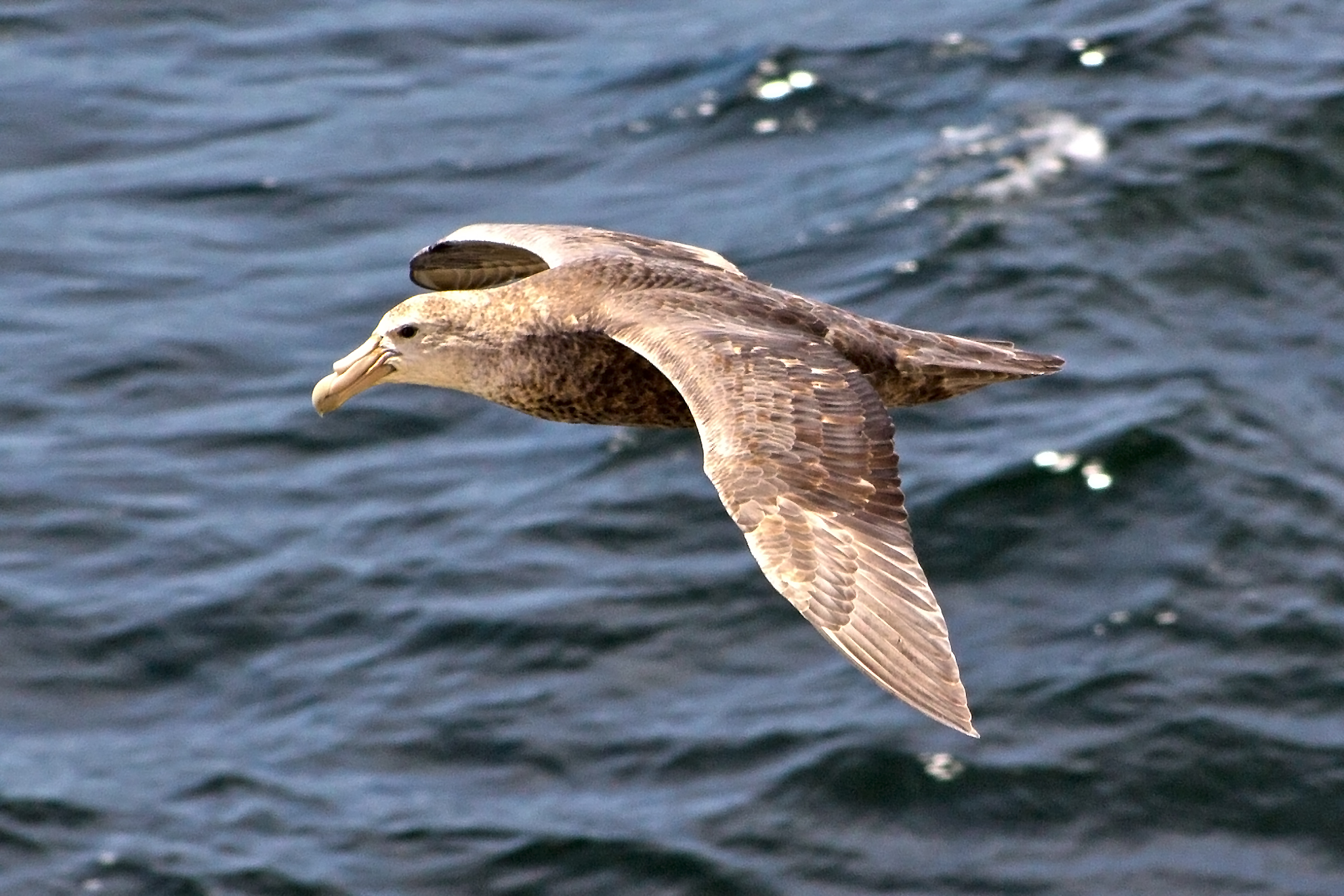
Juvenile

=== Breeding ===
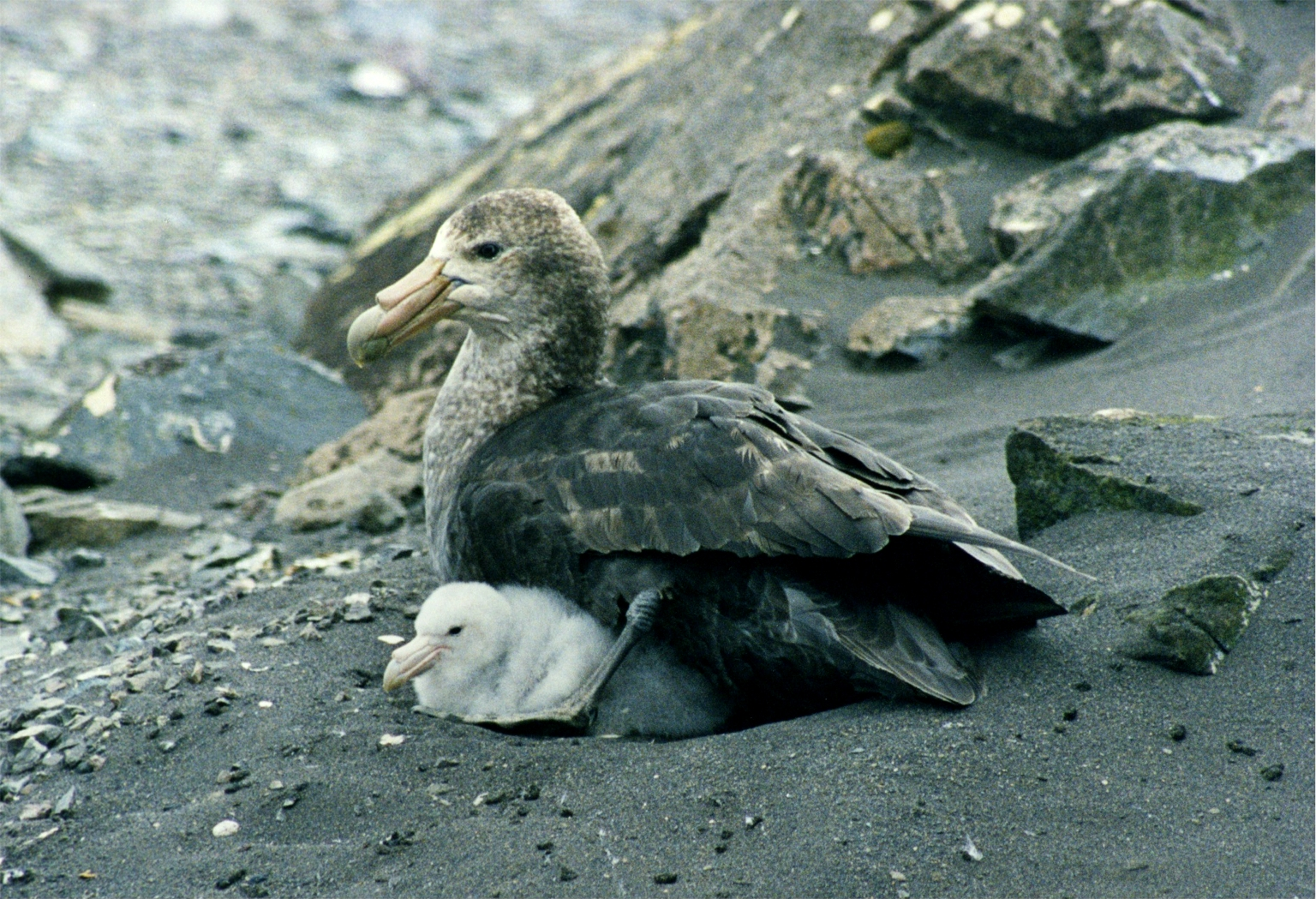
Adult with chick

The southern giant petrel achieves sexual maturity at six or seven years of age; however the average age of first breeding is ten years. Its breeding season begins in mid-October. Its nest is a mound of moss, grass, and stones with a depression in the centre and is located on bare or grassy ground. They form widely dispersed colonies around July–August through to September with the exception of the Falkland Islands where the colonies are much larger.

One immaculate white egg that is 103 by 70 millimetres (4.1 by 2.8 in) is laid. It is incubated for 55–66 days, where it is always guarded by at least one of the parents.

When the white chick is born it is brooded for two to three weeks and it fledges at 104–132 days. The chicks are vulnerable to introduced mammalian predators like small rodents. These are generally not recognised as threats by the members of a colony, and thus can kill many chicks.

=== Feeding ===
The southern giant petrel will feed on fish, krill, squid, offal, and waste from vessels in coastal and pelagic waters, where they often follow fishing boats and cruise ships. Unlike most other Procellariiformes, the southern giant petrel will eat carrion. The southern giant petrel is an extremely aggressive predator and will kill other seabirds. It has been seen preying on the adult Australasian gannet by holding it underwater and drowning it. These birds have also been observed drowning yellow-nosed and black-browed albatrosses. The males exclude females from the carcasses that they are feeding on.

== Conservation ==
Breeding population and trends
Location	Population	Date	Trend
Falkland Islands	19,500 pairs	2005	Increasing
South Georgia	5,500 pairs	2006	Increasing
South Shetland	5,400 pairs	2006	Increasing
South Orkney Islands	3,350 pairs	2006	Increasing
Heard Island and McDonald Islands	2,500 pairs	2005	Decreasing
South America (Isla Noir, Diego Ramirez, Staten Island, Patagonia, islands off Chubut, Argentina)	2,300 pairs	2006	
Macquarie Island	2,145 pairs	2005	Decreasing
Prince Edward Islands	1,800 pairs		
South Sandwich Islands	1,550 pairs	2006	Increasing
Antarctic Peninsula	1,190 pairs		Decreasing
Crozet Islands	1,060 pairs		Increasing
Antarctic Continent (Terre Adélie)	280 pairs	2006	Decreasing
Tristan da Cunha Islands	230 pairs	2004	Increasing
Kerguelen Islands	4 pairs		Increasing
Gough Island	1+ pairs		Increasing
Total	97,000	2007	Decreasing 1%–9% per 10 yr/Increasing now

In 2009, the southern giant petrel was upgraded to a status of least-concern from near-threatened by the IUCN. Overall population trends show that in the 1980s there were 38,000 pairs which dropped to 31,000 in the late 1990s followed by 46,800 presently. The Falkland Islands and most of the South Georgia Archipelago have shown increases from the 1980s to the present. Terre Adélie has shown a drastic reduction as the count fell to 10–15 pairs from 80 pairs in the 1980s. The official generation trend listed by BirdLife International is a 1%–9% decline, but it is stated that this is a conservative number. Furthermore, they elaborate that a best case scenario puts it at a 17% increase and a worst-case scenario of a 7.2% reduction.

Accidental deaths from longline fishing as well as trawl fishing near the Falkland Islands have posed a major threat to the species. Between 2,000 and 4,000 southern giant petrels were killed in 1997–1998 due to illegal longline fishing. Additionally, the number of southern elephant seals, which is an important source of carrion, has been diminishing.

To assist in the southern giant petrel's continued survival, it was listed in CMS Appendix II and ACAP Annex I. Many of the islands that it breeds on are nature reserves, and Gough Island and Macquarie Island are World Heritage Sites. Monitoring is done on South Georgia Island, Marion Island, the Crozet Islands, Terre Adélie, and Macquarie Island. Gough Island has had two censuses in the last decade.

Continued monitoring and surveys at major breeding sites have been proposed, as well as researching movement and migration. Additionally, continued promotion of "best-practice mitigation measures" via existing methods outlined in CCAMLR, CMS, and FAO have also been proposed.

== Sources ==
- BirdLife International (15 Jul 2009). "Southern Giant Petrel – BirdLife Species Factsheet". Data Zone. Archived from the original on 8 December 2008.
- Brooke, M. (2004). "Procellariidae". Albatrosses And Petrels Across The World. Oxford, UK: Oxford University Press. ISBN 978-0-19-850125-1.
- Double, M. C. (2003). "Procellariiformes (Tubenosed Seabirds)". In Hutchins, Michael; Jackson, Jerome A.; Bock, Walter J.; Olendorf, Donna (eds.). Grzimek's Animal Life Encyclopedia. Vol. 8 Birds I Tinamous and Ratites to Hoatzins. Joseph E. Trumpey, Chief Scientific Illustrator (2nd ed.). Farmington Hills, MI: Gale Group. pp. 107–111. ISBN 978-0-7876-5784-0.
- Gotch, A. F. (1995) [1979]. "Albatrosses, Fulmars, Shearwaters, and Petrels". Latin Names Explained A Guide to the Scientific Classifications of Reptiles, Birds & Mammals. New York, NY: Facts on File. pp. 191–192. ISBN 978-0-8160-3377-5.
- Harrison, Colin; Greensmith, Alan (1993). "Non-Passerines". In Bunting, Edward (ed.). Birds of the World (First ed.). New York, NY: Dorling Kindersley. p. 42. ISBN 978-1-56458-295-9.
- IUCN (2009). "2009 Red List category changes" (Excel). Red List.
- Maynard, B. J. (2003). "Shearwaters, petrels, and fulmars (Procellariidae)". In Hutchins, Michael; Jackson, Jerome A.; Bock, Walter J.; Olendorf, Donna (eds.). Grzimek's Animal Life Encyclopedia. Vol. 8 Birds I Tinamous and Ratites to Hoatzins. Joseph E. Trumpey, Chief Scientific Illustrator (2nd ed.). Farmington Hills, MI: Gale Group. pp. 123–133. ISBN 978-0-7876-5784-0.
- Hunter, S. (1983). "The food and feeding ecology of the giant petrels Macronectes halli and M. giganteus at South Georgia". Journal of Zoology. 200 (4): 521–538. doi:10.1111/j.1469-7998.1983.tb02813.x.
- Hauber, Mark E. (1 August 2014). The Book of Eggs: A Life-Size Guide to the Eggs of Six Hundred of the World's Bird Species. Chicago: University of Chicago Press. p. 43. ISBN 978-0-226-05781-1.
