= Salt gland =

Organ for excreting excess salt

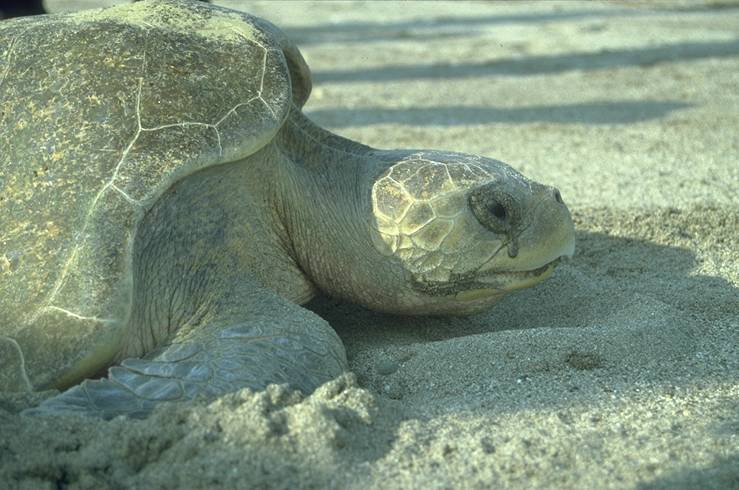
Sea turtles excrete salts through tear ducts. "Crying" is visible when out of water.

The salt gland is an organ for excreting excess salts. It is found in the cartilaginous fishes subclass elasmobranchii (sharks, rays, and skates), seabirds, and some reptiles. Salt glands can be found in the rectum of sharks. Birds and reptiles have salt glands located in or on the skull, usually in the eyes, nose, or mouth. These glands are lobed containing many secretory tubules which radiate outward from the excretory canal at the center. Secretory tubules are lined with a single layer of epithelial cells. The diameter and length of these glands vary depending on the salt uptake of the species.

Salt glands maintain salt balance and allow marine vertebrates to drink seawater. Active transport via sodium–potassium pump, found on the basolateral membrane, moves salt from the blood into the gland, where it is excreted as a concentrated solution.

== In birds ==
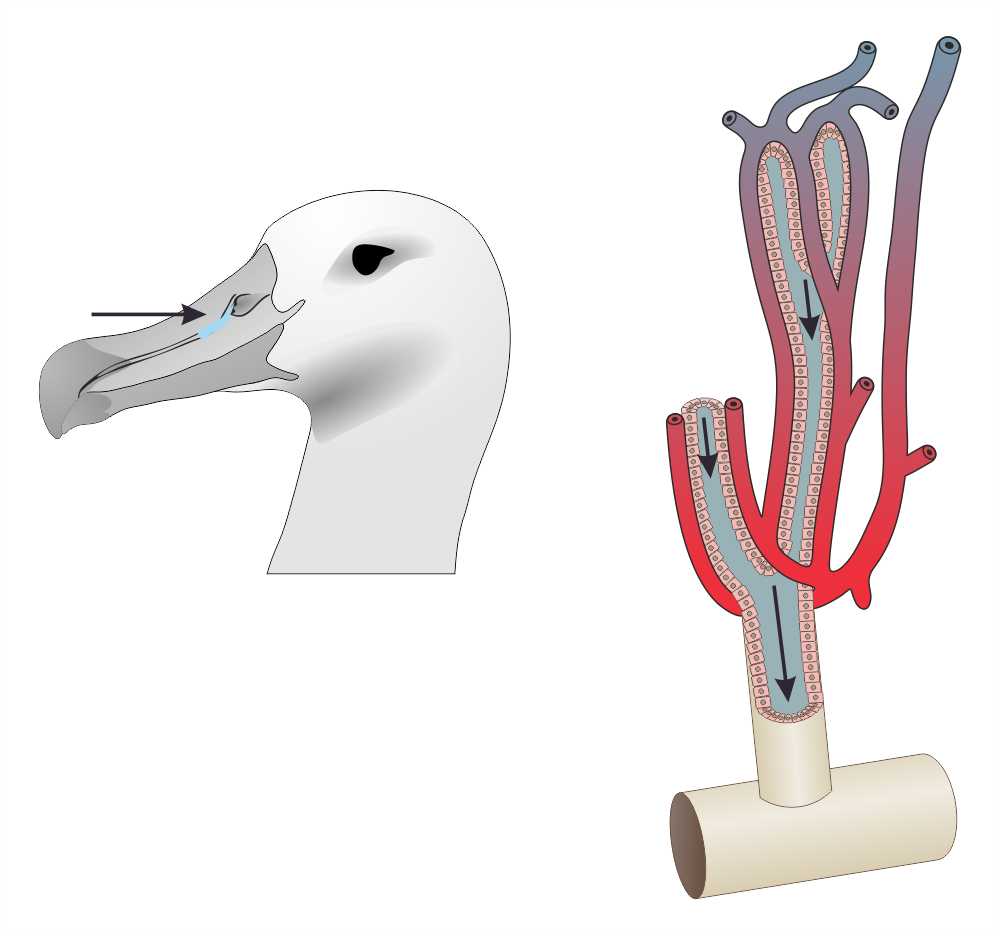
Salt gland of a bird and its inner structure

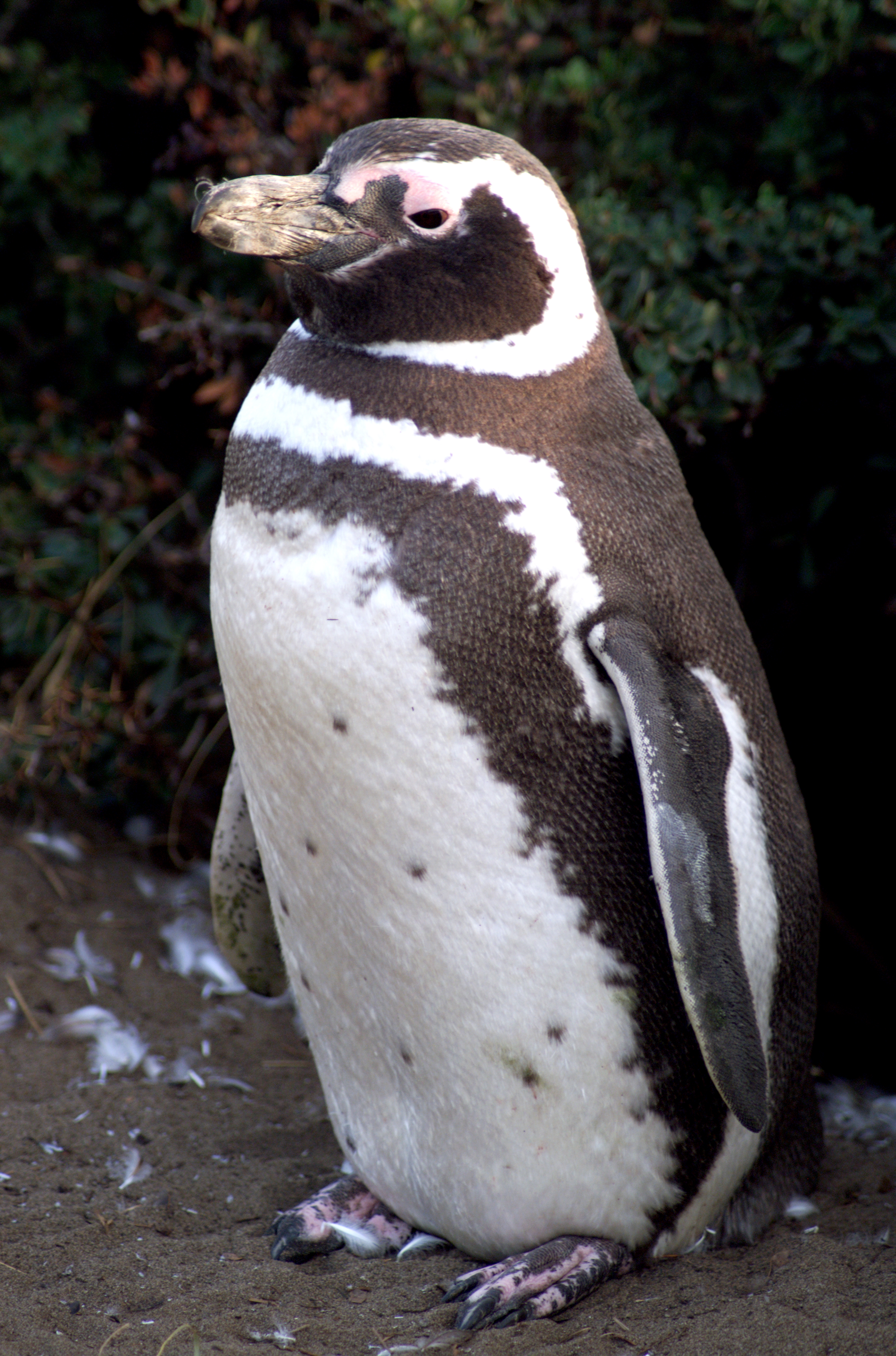
Magellanic penguin

The avian salt gland has two main ducts: a medial and a lateral. Salt gland activations occurs from increased osmolarity in the blood, stimulating the hypothalamic information processing, sending a signal through the parasympathetic nerve activating vasodilation, the release of hormones (acetylcholine and vasoactive intestinal peptide). Acetylcholine binds to the receptor on the basolateral membrane of the gland. This in turn activates calcium release in the epithelial cells, opening potassium channels (flowing potassium out of the cells) on the basolateral membrane and chloride channels on the apical membrane to flow out of the cell. Ions are moved into the epithelial cells by a Na-K-Cl cotransporter, also in the basolateral membrane. Increases in sodium opens the sodium-potassium ATPase channels, removing the excess sodium back out across the basolateral membrane and allowing for potassium to come into the cell. An electrical gradient is formed from the chloride ions, allowing sodium to be passed through the tight junctions of the epithelial cells into the salt gland along with minimal amounts of water. As well, mitochondria-rich cells are associated with changes in salt concentration, increasing with higher amounts and decreasing with lower exposure, assisting in the movement of salts. These glands excrete the hypertonic sodium-chloride (with few other ions) by the stimulus of central and peripheral osmoreceptors and volume receptors.

The supraorbital gland is a type of lateral nasal gland found in some species of marine birds, particularly penguins, which removes sodium chloride from the bloodstream. The gland's function is similar to that of the kidneys, though it is much more efficient at removing salt, allowing penguins to survive without access to fresh water. The supraorbital gland is also possessed by the European herring gull - allowing the seagull to drink seawater without becoming ill, although it prefers to drink fresh water when available. Contrary to popular misconceptions, the gland does not directly convert saltwater to freshwater. The term supraorbital refers to the area just above the eye socket (which is known as the orbit).

Living in saltwater environments would naturally pose a large problem for penguins because the ingestion of saltwater would be detrimental to a penguin's health. Although penguins do not directly drink water, it is taken in when they consume prey. As a result, saltwater enters their system and must be effectively excreted. The supraorbital gland has thus enabled the penguins' survival in such environments due to its water-filtering capability. The gland is located just above the eyes and surrounds a capillary bed in the head. This capillary bed constantly strains out the salt in the saltwater that a penguin takes in. Since the byproduct of the gland has roughly five times as much salt as would normally be found in the animal's fluids, the supraorbital gland is highly efficient.

The penguin excretes the salt byproduct as a brine through its bill. Often, the fluid drips out, and this gives the appearance of a runny nose. However, the fluid may also be sneezed out. In the absence of saltwater, caused by captivity, the supraorbital gland will lie dormant as it has no other purpose. Having a dormant supraorbital gland does not negatively affect the health of a penguin.

== In reptiles ==
The need for salt excretion in reptiles (such as marine iguanas and sea turtles) and birds (such as petrels and albatrosses) reflects their having much less efficient kidneys than mammals. Unlike the skin of amphibians, that of reptiles and birds is impermeable to salt, preventing its release.

The evolution of a salt gland in early reptiles and birds allowed them to eat aquatic plants and animals with high salt concentrations. This evolutionary development does not account for the gland in elasmobranchs, suggesting convergent evolution.

Some theories suggest mammalian tear ducts and sweat glands may be evolutionarily related to salt glands. While human tears are high in potassium, most phylogeneticists disagree with the association.

== See also ==
- Halotolerance
- Lacrimal gland
- Osmoregulation
- Preorbital gland
