= Croisilles =

Croisilles may refer to:

== France ==
Several communes in France:

- Croisilles, Calvados, in the Calvados département
- Croisilles, Eure-et-Loir, in the Eure-et-Loir département
- Croisilles, Orne, in the Orne département
- Croisilles, Pas-de-Calais, in the Pas-de-Calais département

== Papua New Guinea ==
- Cape Croisilles, Papua New Guinea
- Croisilles languages of Papua New Guinea

== New Zealand ==
- Croisilles Harbour, New Zealand
- Croisilles Peak, New Zealand
