= Undecimal =

Base-11 numeral system

Undecimal (also known as unodecimal, undenary, and the base 11 numeral system) is a positional numeral system that uses eleven as its base. While no known society counts by elevens, two are purported to have done so: the Māori (one of the two Polynesian peoples of New Zealand) and the Pañgwa (a Bantu-speaking people of Tanzania). The idea of counting by elevens remains of interest for its relation to a traditional method of tally-counting practiced in Polynesia.

During the French Revolution, undecimal was briefly considered as a possible basis for the reformed system of measurement. Today, undecimal numerals have applications in computer science, technology, and the International Standard Book Number system. They also occasionally feature in works of popular fiction.

Any numerical system with a base greater than ten requires one or more new digits; "in an undenary system (base eleven) there should be a character for ten." To allow entry on typewriters, letters such as ⟨A⟩ (as in hexadecimal), ⟨T⟩ (the initial of "ten"), or ⟨X⟩ (the Roman numeral 10) are used for the number 10 in base 11. It is also possible to use the digit ↊ ("dek"), the so-called Pitman numeral for 10 proposed in 1947 by Isaac Pitman as one of the two transdecimal symbols needed to represent base 12 (duodecimal).

== Alleged use by the Māori ==
=== Conant and Williams ===
For about a century, the idea that Māori counted by elevens was best known from its mention in the writing of the American mathematician Levi Leonard Conant. He identified it as a "mistake" originating with a 19th-century dictionary of the New Zealand language published by the Rev. William Williams, at the time Archdeacon of Waiapu.

"Many years ago a statement appeared which at once attracted attention and awakened curiosity. It was to the effect that the Maoris, the aboriginal inhabitants of New Zealand, used as the basis of their numeral system the number 11; and that the system was quite extensively developed, having simple words for 121 and 1331, i.e. for the square and cube of 11."

As published by Williams in the first two editions of the dictionary series, this statement read:

"The Native mode of counting is by elevens, till they arrive at the tenth eleven, which is their hundred; then onwards to the tenth hundred, which is their thousand:* but those Natives who hold intercourse with Europeans have, for the most part, abandoned this method, and, leaving out ngahuru, reckon tekau or tahi tekau as 10, rua tekau as 20, &c. *This seems to be on the principle of putting aside one to every ten as a tally. A parallel to this obtains among the English, as in the case of the baker's dozen."

=== Lesson and Blosseville ===
In 2020, an earlier, Continental origin of the idea the Māori counted by elevens was traced to the published writings of two 19th-century scientific explorers, René Primevère Lesson and Jules de Blosseville. They had visited New Zealand in 1824 as part of the 1822–1825 circumnavigational voyage of the Coquille, a French corvette commanded by Louis Isidore Duperrey and seconded by Jules Dumont d'Urville. On his return to France in 1825, Lesson published his French translation of an article written by the German botanist Adelbert von Chamisso. At von Chamisso's claim that the New Zealand number system was based on twenty (vigesimal), Lesson inserted a footnote to mark an error:

Von Chamisso's text, as translated by Lesson: "...de l'E. de la mer du Sud ... c'est là qu'on trouve premierement le système arithmétique fondé sur un échelle de vingt, comme dans la Nouvelle-Zélande (2)..." [...east of the South Sea ... is where we first find the arithmetic system based on a scale of twenty, as in New Zealand (2)...]

Lesson's footnote on von Chamisso's text: "(2) Erreur. Le système arithmétique des Zélandais est undécimal, et les Anglais sont les premiers qui ont propagé cette fausse idée. (L.)" [(2) Error. The Zealander arithmetic system is undecimal, and the English are the first to propagate this false idea. (L).]

Von Chamisso had mentioned his error himself in 1821, tracing the source of his confusion and its clarification to Thomas Kendall, the English missionary to New Zealand who provided the material on the Māori language that was the basis for a grammar published in 1820 by the English linguist Samuel Lee. In the same 1821 publication, von Chamisso also identified the Māori number system as decimal, noting the source of the confusion was the Polynesian practice of counting things by pairs, where each pair was counted as a single unit, so that ten units were numerically equivalent to twenty:

"We have before us a Grammar and Vocabulary of the Language of New Zealand, published by the Church Missionary Society. London, 1820. 8vo. The author of this grammar is the same Mr. Kendall who has communicated to us the Vocabulary in Nicolas's voyage. The language has now been opened to us, and we correct our opinion."

And,

"It is very far from easy to find out the arithmetical system of a people. It is at New Zealand, as at Tonga, the decimal system. What may, perhaps, have deceived Mr. Kendall, at the beginning, in his first attempt in Nicholas's voyage, and which we followed, is the custom of the New Zealanders to count things by pairs. The natives of Tonga count the bananas and fish likewise by pairs and by twenties (Tecow, English score)."

Lesson's use of the term "undécimal" in 1825 was possibly a printer's error that conjoined the intended phrase "un décimal," which would have correctly identified New Zealand numeration as decimal. Lesson knew Polynesian numbers were decimal and highly similar throughout the region, as he had learned a lot about Pacific number systems during his 2.5 years on the Coquille, collecting numerical vocabularies and ultimately publishing or commenting on more than a dozen of them. He was also familiar with the work of Thomas Kendall and Samuel Lee through his translation of von Chamisso's work. These circumstances suggest Lesson was unlikely to have misunderstood New Zealand counting as proceeding by elevens.

Lesson and his shipmate and friend, Blosseville, sent accounts of their alleged discovery of elevens-based counting in New Zealand to their contemporaries. At least two of these correspondents published these reports, including the Italian geographer Adriano Balbi, who detailed a letter he received from Lesson in 1826, and the Hungarian astronomer Franz Xaver von Zach, who briefly mentioned the alleged discovery as part of a letter from Blosseville he had received through a third party. De Blosseville also mentioned it to the Scottish author George Lillie Craik, who reported this letter in his 1830 book The New Zealanders. Lesson was also likely the author of an undated essay, written by a Frenchman but otherwise anonymous, found among and published with the papers of the Prussian linguist Wilhelm von Humboldt in 1839.

The story expanded in its retelling: The 1826 letter published by Balbi added an alleged numerical vocabulary with terms for eleven squared (Karaou) and eleven cubed (Kamano), as well as an account of how the number-words and counting procedure were supposedly elicited from local informants. In an interesting twist, it also changed the mistaken classification needing correction from vigesimal to decimal. The 1839 essay published with von Humboldt's papers named Thomas Kendall, the English missionary whose confusion over the effects of pair-counting on Māori numbers had caused von Chamisso to misidentify them as vigesimal. It also listed places the alleged local informants were supposedly from.

=== Relation to traditional counting ===
The idea that Māori counted by elevens highlights an ingenious and pragmatic form of counting once practiced throughout Polynesia. This method of counting set aside every tenth item to mark ten of the counted items; the items set aside were subsequently counted in the same way, with every tenth item now marking a hundred (second round), thousand (third round), ten thousand items (fourth round), and so on. The counting method worked the same regardless of whether the base unit was a single item, pair, or group of four — base counting units used throughout the region — and it was the basis for the unique binary counting found in Mangareva, where counting could also proceed by groups of eight.

The method of counting also solves another mystery: why the Hawaiian word for twenty, iwakalua, means "nine and two." When the counting method was used with pairs, nine pairs were counted (18) and the last pair (2) was set aside for the next round.

== Alleged use by the Pañgwa ==
Less is known about the idea the Pañgwa people of Tanzania counted by elevens. It was mentioned in 1920 by the British anthropologist Northcote W. Thomas:

"Another abnormal numeral system is that of the Pangwa, north-east of Lake Nyassa, who use a base of eleven."

And,

"If we could be certain that ki dzigo originally bore the meaning of eleven, not ten, in Pangwa, it would be tempting to correlate the dzi or či with the same word in Walegga-Lendu, where it means twelve, and thus bring into a relation, albeit of the flimsiest and most remote kind, all three areas in which abnormal systems are in use."

The claim was repeated by the British explorer and colonial administrator Harry H. Johnston in Vol. II of his 1922 study of the Bantu and Semi-Bantu languages. He too noted suggestive similarities between the Pañgwa term for eleven and terms for ten in related languages:

"Occasionally there are special terms for 'eleven'. So far as my information goes they are the following:

Ki-dzigꞷ 36 (in this language, the Pangwa of North-east Nyasaland, counting actually goes by elevens. Ki-dzigꞷ-kavili = 'twenty-two', Ki-dzigꞷ-kadatu = 'thirty-three'). Yet the root -dzigꞷ is obviously the same as the -tsigꞷ, which stands for 'ten' in No. 38. It may also be related to the -digi ('ten') of 148, -tuku or -dugu of the Ababua and Congo tongues, -dikꞷ of 130, -liku of 175 ('eight'), and the Tiag of 249."

In Johnston's classification of the Bantu and Semi-Bantu languages,

- 36 is Pañgwa, Bantu Group J, N. Ruvuma, NE Nyasaland
- 38 is Kiñga, Bantu Group K, Ukiñga
- 130 is Ba-ñkutu (Ba-ñkpfutu), Bantu Group DD, Central Congꞷland
- 148 is Li-huku, Bantu Group HH, Upper Ituri
- 175 is Ifumu or Ifuru (E. Teke), Bantu Group LL, Kwa-Kasai-Upper Ꞷgꞷwe (Teke)
- 249 is Afudu, Semi-Bantu Group D, S. Benue

Pañgwa undecimal counting was not confirmed by later research, and the idea is now believed to have been an error. Today, Pañgwa is understood to have decimal numbers; the numbers 'ten' and higher have been influenced by or borrowed from Swahili.

== In the history of measurement ==
In June 1789, mere weeks before the French Revolution began with the storming of the Bastille, the Academy of Sciences established a committee (la Commission des Poids et Mesures) to standardize systems of weights and measures, a popular reform that was an early step toward creating the international metric system. On 27 October 1790, the committee reported they had considered using duodecimal (base 12) as the basis for weights, lengths/distances, and money because of its greater divisibility, relative to decimal (base 10). However, they ultimately rejected the initiative, deciding a common scale based on spoken numbers would simplify calculations and conversions and make the new system easier to implement. Mathematician Joseph-Louis Lagrange, a member of the committee, was credited with influencing the committee to select decimal. The debate over which one to use seems to have been lively, if not contentious, as at one point, Lagrange suggested adopting 11 as the base number, on the grounds indivisibility was actually advantageous; because 11 was a prime number, no fraction with it as its denominator would be reducible:

Delambre wrote: "Il était peu frappé de l'objection que l'on tirait contre ce système du petit nombre des diviseurs de sa base. Il regrettait presque qu'elle ne fut pas un nombre premier, tel que 11, qui nécessairement eût donné un même dénominateur à toutes les fractions. On regardera, si l'on veut, cette idée comme une de ces exagérations qui échappent aux meilleurs esprits dans le feu de la dispute; mais il n'employait ce nombre 11 que pour écarter le nombre 12, que des novateurs plus intrépides auraient voulu substituer à celui de 10, qui fait partout la base de la numération."

As translated: "He [Lagrange] almost regretted [the base] was not a prime number, such as 11, which necessarily would give all fractions the same denominator. This idea will be regarded, if you will, as one of those exaggerations that escape the best minds in the heat of argument; but he only used the number 11 to rule out the number 12, which the more intrepid innovators wanted to substitute for 10, which is the basis of numeration everywhere."

In 1795, in the published public lectures at the École Normale, Lagrange observed that fractions with varying denominators (e.g., 1/2, 1/3, 1/4, 1/5, 1/7), though simple in themselves, were inconvenient, as their different denominators made them difficult to compare. That is, fractions aren't difficult to compare if the numerator is 1 (e.g., 1/2 is larger than 1/3, which in turn is larger than 1/4). However, comparisons become more difficult when both numerators and denominators are mixed: 3/4 is larger than 5/7, which in turn is larger than 2/3, though this cannot be determined by simple inspection of the denominators in the way possible if the numerator is 1. He noted the difficulty was resolved if all the fractions had the same denominator:

Lagrange wrote: "On voit aussi par-là, qu'il est indifférent que le nombre qui suit la base du système, comme le nombre 10 dans notre système décimal, ait des diviseurs ou non; peut-être même y aurait-il, à quelques égards, de l'avantage à ce que ce nombre n'eût point de diviseurs, comme le nombre 11, ce qui aurait lieu dans le système undécimal, parce qu'on en serait moins porté à employer les fractions 1/2, 1/3, etc."

As translated: "We also see by this [argument about divisibility], it does not matter whether the number that is the base of the system, like the number 10 in our decimal system, has divisors or not; perhaps there would even be, in some respects, an advantage if this number did not have divisors, like the number 11, which would happen in the undecimal system, because one would be less inclined to use the fractions 1/2, 1/3, etc."

In recounting the story, Ralph H. Beard (in 1947, president of the then-named Duodecimal Society of America) noted that base 11 numbers have the disadvantage that for prime numbers higher than 11, "we are unable to tell, without actually testing them, not only whether or not they are prime, but, surprisingly, whether or not they are odd or even."

== In science and technology ==
Undecimal (often referred to as unodecimal in this context) is useful in computer science and technology for understanding complement (subtracting by negative addition) and performing digit checks on a decimal channel.

The 10-digit numbers in the system of International Standard Book Numbers (ISBN) used undecimal as a check digit. A check digit is the final digit of an ISBN that is related mathematically to all the other digits it contains that is used to verify their accuracy. It represents the answer to a mathematical calculation, in this case, one that multiplies the ten digits of the ISBN by the integers ten (leftmost digit) through two (second-to-last rightmost digit, the last being the check digit itself) and then sums them. The calculation should yield a multiple of eleven, with its final digit, represented by the digits 0 through 9 or an X (for ten), being equal to the tenth digit of the ISBN. As of 1 January 2007, thirteen-digit ISBNs are the standard. The International ISBN Agency provides an online calculator that will convert ten-digit ISBNs into thirteen digits.

== In popular fiction ==
Base 11 periodically features in works of popular fiction, particularly science fiction. For example, in Battlefield Earth by L. Ron Hubbard, the villainous alien race known as the Psychlos use base 11 for their mathematics because they have eleven fingers, "six talons on their right paws and five on their left." Similarly, in the television series Babylon 5, the advanced race known as the Minbari use undecimal numbers because they count on ten fingers and the head. In the novel Contact by Carl Sagan, a message left by an unknown advanced intelligence lies hidden inside the number pi; the message is best revealed when pi is computed "in Base 11 arithmetic." In the Season 9 finale of The Office, fictional character Kevin Malone invents the base 11 number Keleven to cover up his mathematical incompetence.

== Examples ==
This table shows the powers of 2 in undecimal.

Doubles
Decimal	Undecimal
1	1
2	2
4	4
8	8
16	15
32	2A
64	59
128	107
256	213
512	426
1,024	851
2,048	1,5A2

This table shows how to multiply small integers in undecimal.

×	1	2	3	4	5	6	7	8	9	A	10	11
1	1	2	3	4	5	6	7	8	9	A	10	11
2	2	4	6	8	A	11	13	15	17	19	20	22
3	3	6	9	11	14	17	1A	22	25	28	30	33
4	4	8	11	15	19	22	26	2A	33	37	40	44
5	5	A	14	19	23	28	32	37	41	46	50	55
6	6	11	17	22	28	33	39	44	4A	55	60	66
7	7	13	1A	26	32	39	45	51	58	64	70	77
8	8	15	22	2A	37	44	51	59	66	73	80	88
9	9	17	25	33	41	4A	58	66	74	82	90	99
A	A	19	28	37	46	55	64	73	82	91	A0	AA
10	10	20	30	40	50	60	70	80	90	A0	100	110
11	11	22	33	44	55	66	77	88	99	AA	110	121

== See also ==
- Undecimal check digit for ten-digit ISBNs
