= Scuticaria =

Scuticaria is the generic name of two groups of organisms. It can refer to:

- Scuticaria (fish), a genus of eels in the family Muraenidae
- Scuticaria (plant), a genus of orchids in the family Orchidaceae
