= Charles Dumont de Sainte-Croix =

French zoologist (1758–1830)

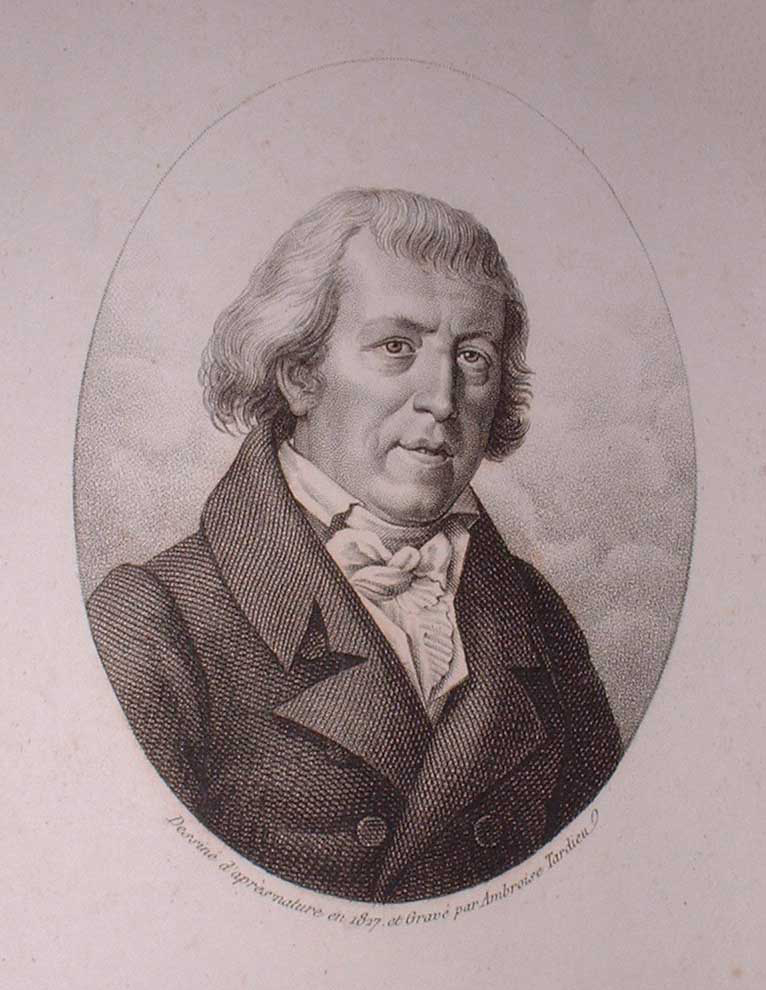
- Born: 27 April 1758
- Died: 8 January 1830 (aged 71)
- Known for: Description of Javanese bird species
- Children: Marie Clémence Lesson
- Scientific career
- Fields: Lawyer and amateur ornithologist
- Author abbrev. (zoology): Dumont

Charles Henri Frédéric Dumont de Sainte-Croix (French pronunciation: [ʃaʁl ɑ̃ʁi fʁedeʁik dymɔ̃ də sɛ̃t kʁwa]; 27 April 1758 – 8 January 1830) was a French zoologist.

A lawyer by trade, he was also an enthusiastic amateur ornithologist. Between 1817 and 1818, he described a number of Javanese bird species discovered by Jean Baptiste Leschenault de la Tour; he also contributed articles on ornithology to the Dictionnaire des sciences naturelles, edited and published from 1816 to 1830 by F. G. Levrault.

Dumont de Sainte-Croix's daughter, Clémence married René-Primevère Lesson, a surgeon and noted French naturalist.

His younger brother, André Dumont was elected to the Convention during the French Revolution.

He was honoured in 1813, in the naming of Dumontia, which is a genus of red algae belonging to the family Dumontiaceae.

== Bibliography ==
- Stresemann, Erwin (1975). Ornithology from Aristotle to the Present. Harvard University Press. ISBN 0-674-64485-9.
