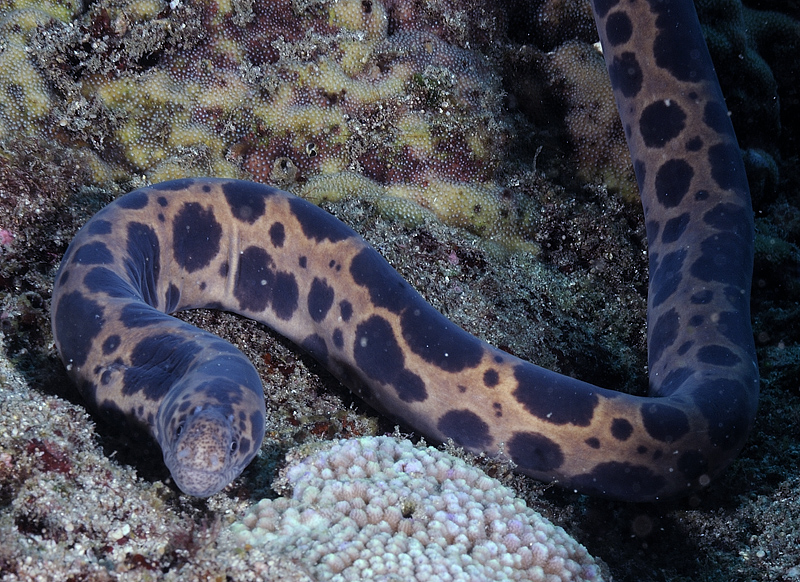

Conservation status
- Least Concern (IUCN 3.1)

Scientific classification
- Kingdom: Animalia
- Phylum: Chordata
- Class: Actinopterygii
- Division: Teleostei
- Order: Anguilliformes
- Family: Muraenidae
- Genus: Scuticaria
- Species: S. tigrina

Binomial name
- Scuticaria tigrina (Lesson, 1828)

= Scuticaria tigrina =

Species of ray-finned fish

Scuticaria tigrina is a moray eel found in coral reefs in the Pacific and Indian Oceans. It is commonly known as the tiger reef-eel, tiger snake moray, tiger moray eel, tiger moray, tiger eel, spotted eel, or the spotted snake moray. It has distinctive black spots and stripes resembling tiger marks and is known to camouflage within the reef environment.

== Description ==
Scuticaria tigrina can reach a total length of about 140 cm (55 in). Its body is elongated and cylindrical, with a very short tail and longitudinal fins almost exclusively on the tail. It has two rows of sharp conical teeth, which allow it to catch its prey efficiently. The body color is yellowish brown to reddish brown with round black spots bordered by yellow.

== Distribution and habitat ==
Scuticaria tigrina can be found across the tropical Indo-Pacific, from East Africa to the Society Islands, including Hawaii, the Philippines, and Indonesia, as well as Mexico, Costa Rica, and Panama. This species is usually found on shallow reefs and prefers crevices, sandy or rocky areas where it can hide during the day.

== Human use ==
Although sometimes encountered by divers and kept in aquariums, Scuticaria tigrina is not a major commercial fishery species. In some areas, it is used for food, but it is mainly of ecological importance.
