= Ōkiwi Bay =

Rural settlement in Marlborough, New Zealand

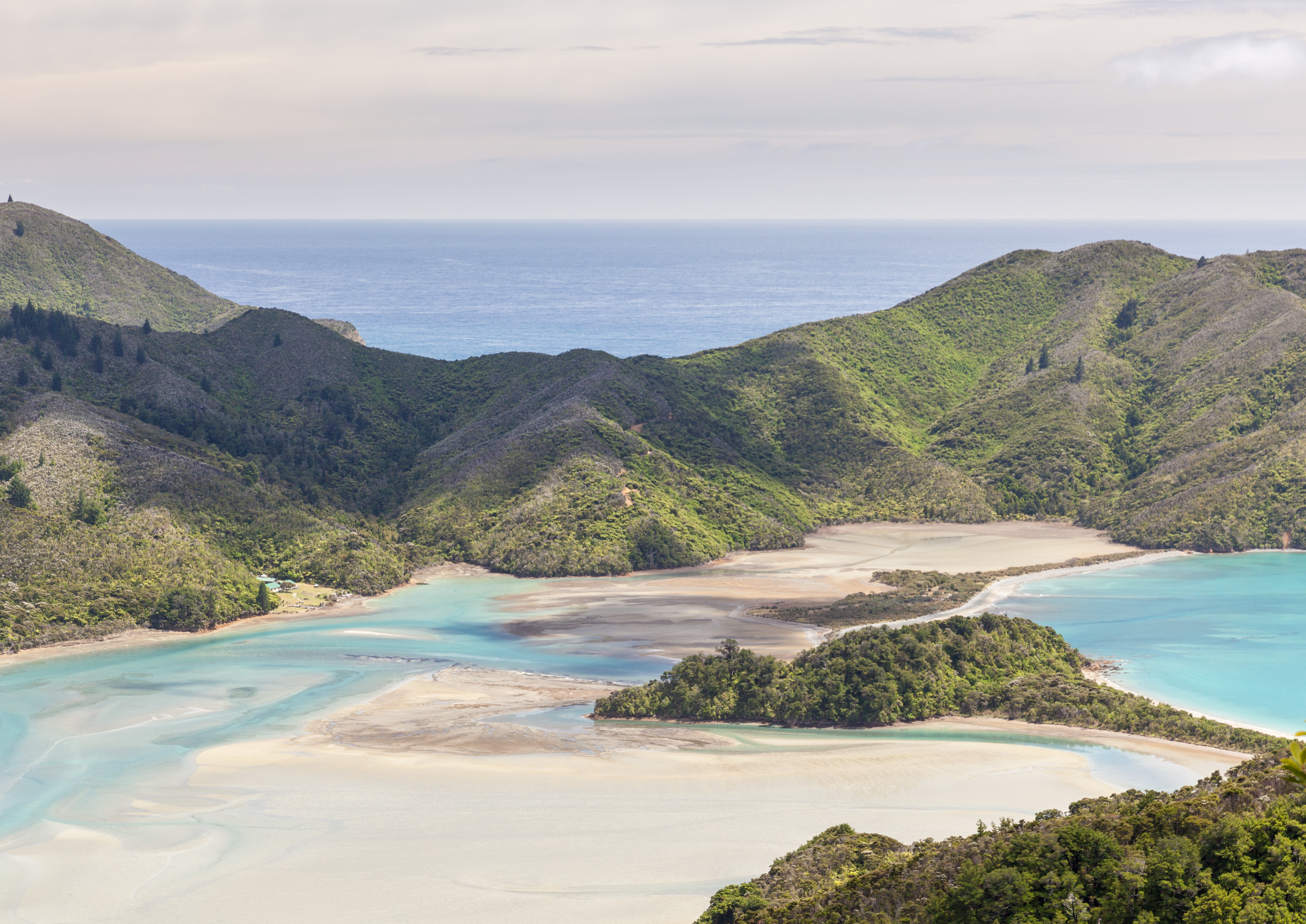
- Whangarae Bay
- Interactive map of Ōkiwi Bay
- Coordinates: 41°06′45″S 173°39′36″E
- Country: New Zealand
- Region: Marlborough
- Ward: Marlborough Sounds General Ward; Marlborough Māori Ward
- Electorates: Kaikōura; Te Tai Tonga (Māori)

Government
  - Territorial Authority: Marlborough District Council
  - Marlborough District Mayor: Nadine Taylor
  - Kaikōura MP: Stuart Smith
  - Te Tai Tonga MP: Mananui Ramsden

Area
  - Total: 1.08 km^{2} (0.42 sq mi)

Population (June 2025)
  - Total: 80
  - Density: 74/km^{2} (190/sq mi)

Ōkiwi Bay is a small town in the Marlborough Sounds, New Zealand, within Croisilles Harbour. It has about 200 houses and about 80 permanent residents. The area was noted for its oysters.

== Name ==
Ōkiwi Bay officially had a macron added to its name on 5 November 2018 by the New Zealand Geographic Board. The New Zealand Ministry for Culture and Heritage gives a translation of "place of the kiwi" for Ōkiwi.

== About ==
There were pre-European Māori settlements in this area and the Bay's name dates from those times. The primary Ngāti Koata settlement in the area was at Whangarae, adjacent to Ōkiwi Bay on the western side of Goat Hill. In 1880 50 acres was leased by the Crown to Alabby Hobbs. A saw mill was opened in the 1890s by Messrs Mace and Holland who had lease 3,200 acres of Māori land. A track to the Rai Valley was made in 1895. By 1904 Ōkiwi Bay had become a popular destination for holiday makers.

In 1957 a unique patu was uncovered while excavating a load of single from a beach in Ōkiwi Bay. The patu was described as being stone and resembling a medieval mace. The style was more in line with those from the Chatham Islands, but the stone was definitely of local, Ōkiwi Bay, origin.

It is a base for the Okiwi Bay Voluntary Rural Fire Force and St John's Ambulance. There is a holiday park and the area is predominantly a holiday resort. In 2015 when a Dutch aquaculture company, Skretting, proposed setting up a fish farm in the Bay, local residents protested against it, stating that it would ruin the natural resources of the area. The Environment Court granted permission for Skretting's to proceed in 2016. In 2017 the settlement got mobile phone coverage.

== Demographics ==
Ōkiwi Bay is described by Statistics New Zealand as a rural settlement. It covers 1.08 km^{2} (0.42 sq mi) and had an estimated population of 80 as of June 2025, with a population density of 74 people per km^{2}. It is part of the larger Marlborough Sounds West statistical area.

Historical population
| Year | Pop. | ±% p.a. |
|---|---|---|
| 2006 | 99 | — |
| 2013 | 81 | −2.83% |
| 2018 | 63 | −4.90% |
| 2023 | 84 | +5.92% |

Ōkiwi Bay had a population of 84 in the 2023 New Zealand census, an increase of 21 people (33.3%) since the 2018 census, and an increase of 3 people (3.7%) since the 2013 census. There were 42 males and 45 females in 48 dwellings. The median age was 67.2 years (compared with 38.1 years nationally). There were no people aged under 15 years, 3 (3.6%) aged 15 to 29, 33 (39.3%) aged 30 to 64, and 48 (57.1%) aged 65 or older.

People could identify as more than one ethnicity. The results were 92.9% European (Pākehā), 17.9% Māori, and 3.6% Pasifika. English was spoken by 100.0%, Māori by 3.6%, and other languages by 3.6%. The percentage of people born overseas was 7.1, compared with 28.8% nationally.

The sole religious affiliation given was 25.0% Christian. People who answered that they had no religion were 57.1%, and 17.9% of people did not answer the census question.

Of those at least 15 years old, 9 (10.7%) people had a bachelor's or higher degree, 42 (50.0%) had a post-high school certificate or diploma, and 36 (42.9%) people exclusively held high school qualifications. The median income was $27,200, compared with $41,500 nationally. 3 people (3.6%) earned over $100,000 compared to 12.1% nationally. The employment status of those at least 15 was 24 (28.6%) full-time, 12 (14.3%) part-time, and 3 (3.6%) unemployed.
