= Scuticaria okinawae =

Muraena australiae

Conservation status
- Least Concern (IUCN 3.1)

Scientific classification
- Kingdom: Animalia
- Phylum: Chordata
- Class: Actinopterygii
- Order: Anguilliformes
- Family: Muraenidae
- Genus: Scuticaria
- Species: S. okinawae

Binomial name
- Scuticaria okinawae (D. S. Jordan & Snyder, 1901)

Species of fish

Scuticaria okinawae is a moray eel found in the Pacific and Indian Oceans. It is commonly known as the shorttailed snake moray, shorttail moray, Seale's moray eel, or the Bennett's moray.

== Description ==
The shorttail moray is uniform gray, brown, or purplish-brown in color, having a slender body with a blunt head and small eyes, and attains a length of up to 90.5 centimetres (35.6 in) SL. This species is identified by its noticeably short tail, with the anus at 2/3 TL. The shorttail moray is believed to be nocturnal, as there is no certainty in its sleep cycle. This species of moray has been rarely sighted, and not much is known regarding its life.

== Distribution and habitat ==
The shorttail moray can be found in the tropical Indo-Pacific region, including Japan, Hawaii, etc, as well as Indonesia, the Philippines, South Africa, etc. It is usually found hiding in coral reefs and rocks.

== Taxonomy ==
Scuticaria okinawae was previously referred to as Gymnomuraena bennetti, Scuticaria bennetti, or Uropterygius bennetti in a number of publications (Smith 1962; McCosker et al. 1984; Randall 1996). However, Böhlke and McCosker (1997) demonstrated that Gymnomuraena bennetti is a junior synonym of Channomuraena vittata, so they resurrected okinawae for the eel previously misidentified as bennetti. Uropterygius unicolor Seale, 1917 (given the unnecessary replacement name U. sealei Whitley, 1932) and Gymnomuraena brevicauda Regan, 1903 are synonyms.
