= Marie Clémence Lesson =

French illustrator

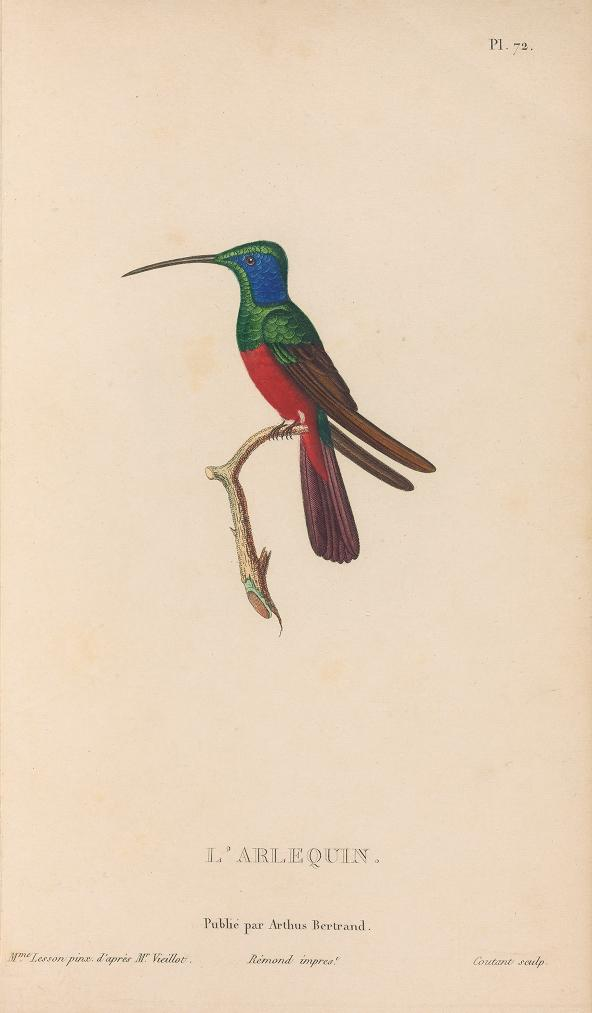
Histoirenaturel00Less

Marie Clémence Lesson (French pronunciation: [maʁi klemɑ̃s lɛsɔ̃]; March 2 1800 – August 4 1834) was an illustrator and the second wife of French ornithologist René Lesson, whom she married in 1827. She trained as a natural history artist in Paris and her illustrations appear in her husband's book Histoire Naturelle des Oiseaux-Mouches. Her father was the French zoologist Charles Dumont de Sainte-Croix. Lesson died of Cholera in 1834.
