= Scuticaria (fish) =

Scientific classification
- Kingdom: Animalia
- Phylum: Chordata
- Class: Actinopterygii
- Division: Teleostei
- Order: Anguilliformes
- Family: Muraenidae
- Subfamily: Uropterygiinae
- Genus: Scuticaria; D.S. Jordan and Snyder, 1901

Type species
- Ichthyophis tigrinus Lesson, 1828

Species
- See text.

Genus of moray eels

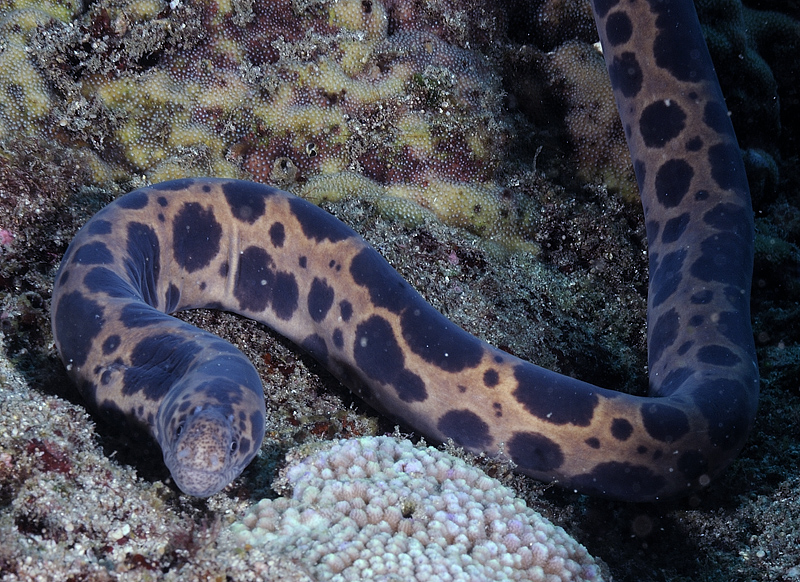
A Scuticaria tigrina morene in Reunion Island (February 2013).

Scuticaria is a genus of moray eel in the family Muraenidae.

== Species ==
- Scuticaria okinawae (D. S. Jordan & Snyder, 1901) (Shorttailed snake moray)
- Scuticaria tigrina (Lesson, 1828) (Tiger reef-eel)
