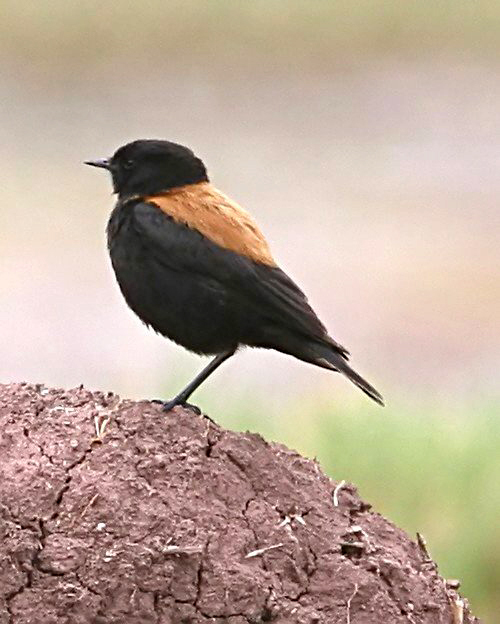
- Andean negrito (Lessonia oreas)
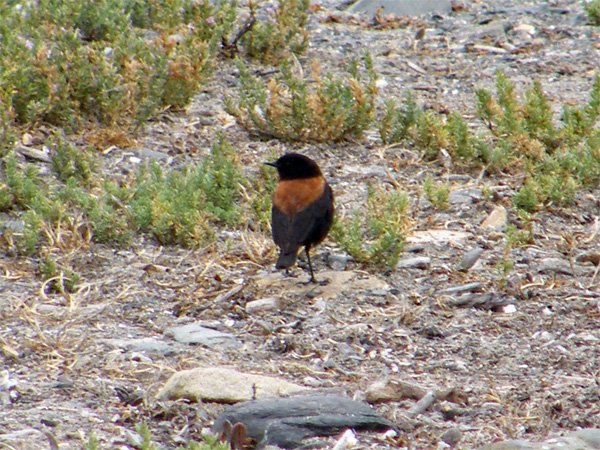
- Austral negrito (Lessonia rufa)

Scientific classification
- Kingdom: Animalia
- Phylum: Chordata
- Class: Aves
- Order: Passeriformes
- Family: Tyrannidae
- Genus: Lessonia; Swainson, 1832

Type species
- Anthus sordidus Lesson, 1830

= Lessonia (bird) =

Genus of birds

Lessonia is a genus of South American birds in the tyrant flycatcher family, found near freshwater lakes and saline marshes.

The genus was erected by the English naturalist William Swainson in 1832 with the Austral negrito as the type species. The genus name was chosen to honour the French Navy surgeon and naturalist René Lesson (1794–1849).

== Species ==
The genus contains two species:

Male	Female	Scientific name	Common name	Distribution
		Lessonia oreas	Andean negrito	central Peru south into western Bolivia, down into north eastern Chile and northern Argentina
		Lessonia rufa	Austral negrito	Argentina and Chile, migrating north as far as Bolivia, southern Brazil, Paraguay and Uruguay
