= Pierre Henri Gauttier Duparc =

French Navy officer and admiral

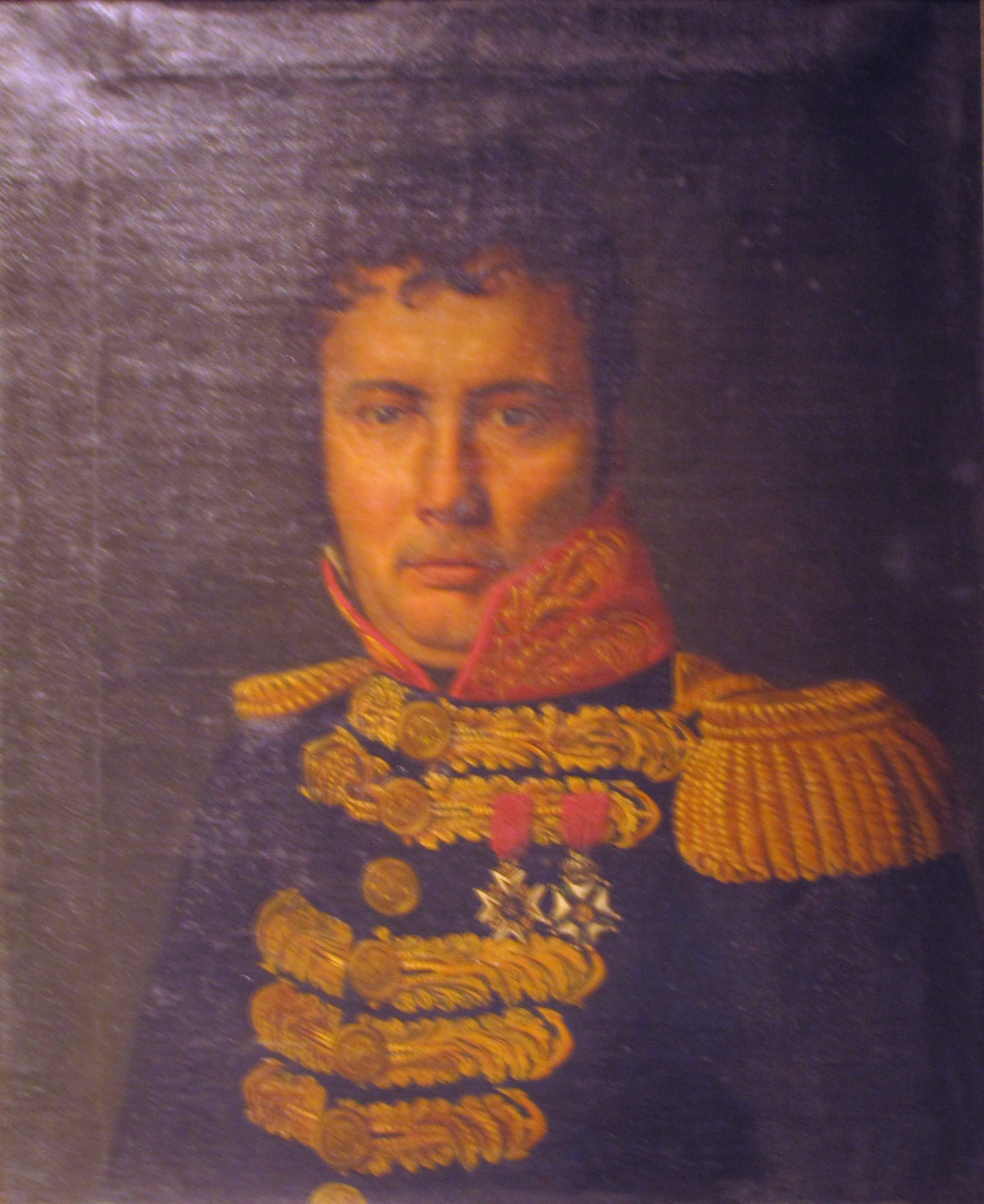

Pierre Henri Gauttier Duparc (French pronunciation: [pjɛʁ ɑ̃ʁi ɡotje dypaʁk]; 1772 – 1850) was a French Navy officer and admiral. Gauttier Duparc captained Chevrette in 1819 during the travels of Jules Dumont d'Urville, where he contributed to the discovery of the Venus de Milo. His interest for marine chronometers earned him the nickname of "Gauttier l'horloge" ("clockwork Gauttier").

== Notes, citations, and references ==
Notes

Citations

References

- Taillemite, Étienne (2002). Dictionnaire des Marins français. Tallandier. ISBN 2-84734-008-4. OCLC 606770323.
