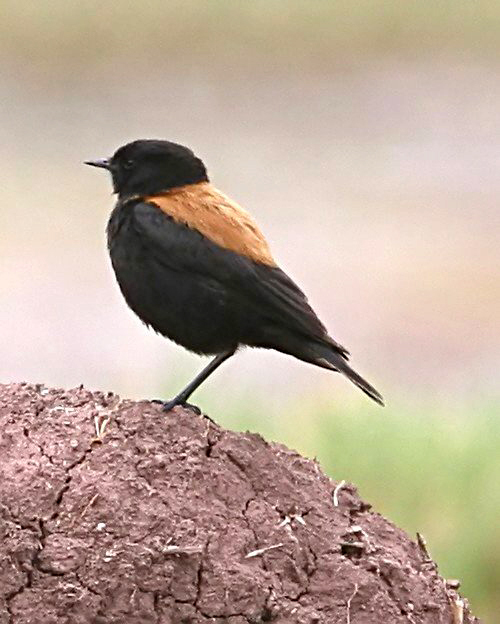
- Male

Conservation status
- Least Concern (IUCN 3.1)

Scientific classification
- Kingdom: Animalia
- Phylum: Chordata
- Class: Aves
- Order: Passeriformes
- Family: Tyrannidae
- Genus: Lessonia
- Species: L. oreas

Binomial name
- Lessonia oreas (Sclater, PL & Salvin, 1869)

Synonyms
- Centrites oreas

= Andean negrito =

Species of bird

The Andean negrito (Lessonia oreas) is a species of bird in the family Tyrannidae, the tyrant flycatchers. It is found in Argentina, Bolivia, Chile, and Peru.

== Taxonomy and systematics ==
The Andean negrito was originally described as Centrites oreas. The species now shares genus Lessonia with the austral negrito (L. rufa); that genus was erected in 1832 by William Swainson. The two were long considered conspecific. Late in the twentieth century they were separated based primarily on plumage differences, and a 2014 publication added differences in feather structure and courtship displays to the evidence.

The Andean negrito is monotypic.

== Description ==
The Andean negrito is 12.5 to 13 cm (4.9 to 5.1 in) long. Adult males are mostly black with a pale rufous back. The inner webs of their flight feathers are silvery white that makes the wing look pale in flight but are seldom visible at rest. Adult females are smaller than males. They have a mostly blackish brown head and upperparts with a dull rufous back. The inner webs of their flight feathers are sandy brown. Their chin is whitish, their breast and belly sooty with rufous sides on the breast, and their crissum blackish. Juveniles are similar to adult females but much paler overall. Both sexes have a dark iris and a short black bill. Their legs and feet are black with exceptionally long hindclaws like those of a pipit.

== Distribution and habitat ==
The species is found along the Andes from southeastern Ancash and southwestern Huánuco departments in central Peru south through western Bolivia, eastern Chile to the Coquimbo Region, and northwestern Argentina to Catamarca Province. The species inhabits open grassy landscapes with some low shrubs at the margins of lakes, streams, and bogs. In elevation it ranges overall between 3,000 and 4,000 m (9,800 and 13,100 ft) and occasionally as low as 1,000 m (3,300 ft) in Chile. In Peru it is found between 3,100 and 4,600 m (10,200 and 15,100 ft) though there are rare records down to sea level.

== Behavior ==
=== Movement ===
The Andean negrito is a year-round resident though a few individuals move to lower elevations (even to near sea level) during the austral winter.

=== Feeding ===
The Andean negrito feeds primarily on insects. It is mostly terrestrial but will often perch on rocks or tussocks. It mostly forages in pairs or family groups. It catches prey in mid-air with short sallies and on the ground between short flights and runs.

=== Breeding ===
The Andean negrito breeds between October and January in Chile; its season elsewhere is not known. Males make a fluttering display flight as high as 10 to 15 m (35 to 50 ft) above the ground. The species' nest is an open cup made from grass and other fibers, lined with feathers, and usually concealed in a tussock or grass. The clutch is three or four eggs. Nothing else is known about the species's breeding biology.

=== Vocal and non-vocal sounds ===
As of April 2025 xeno-canto had six recordings of Andean negrito vocalizations and the Cornell Lab of Ornithology's Macaulay Library had 11 with some overlap. The species' calls include a repeated "short, rather faint tyt" and in alarm "a very high-pitched zi". Another description of the first call is "a quiet, dry djret". During their display males make "tsi" notes when perched, "tic" notes when ascending, and "psie" notes when descending. During the descent their wings make a "trrrrrrrrrr".

== Status ==
The IUCN has assessed the Andean negrito as being of Least Concern. It has a large range; its population size is not known and is believed to be stable. No immediate threats have been identified. It is considered uncommon to locally fairly common overall and locally common in Peru. It occurs in at least one protected area in each of Chile and Peru.
