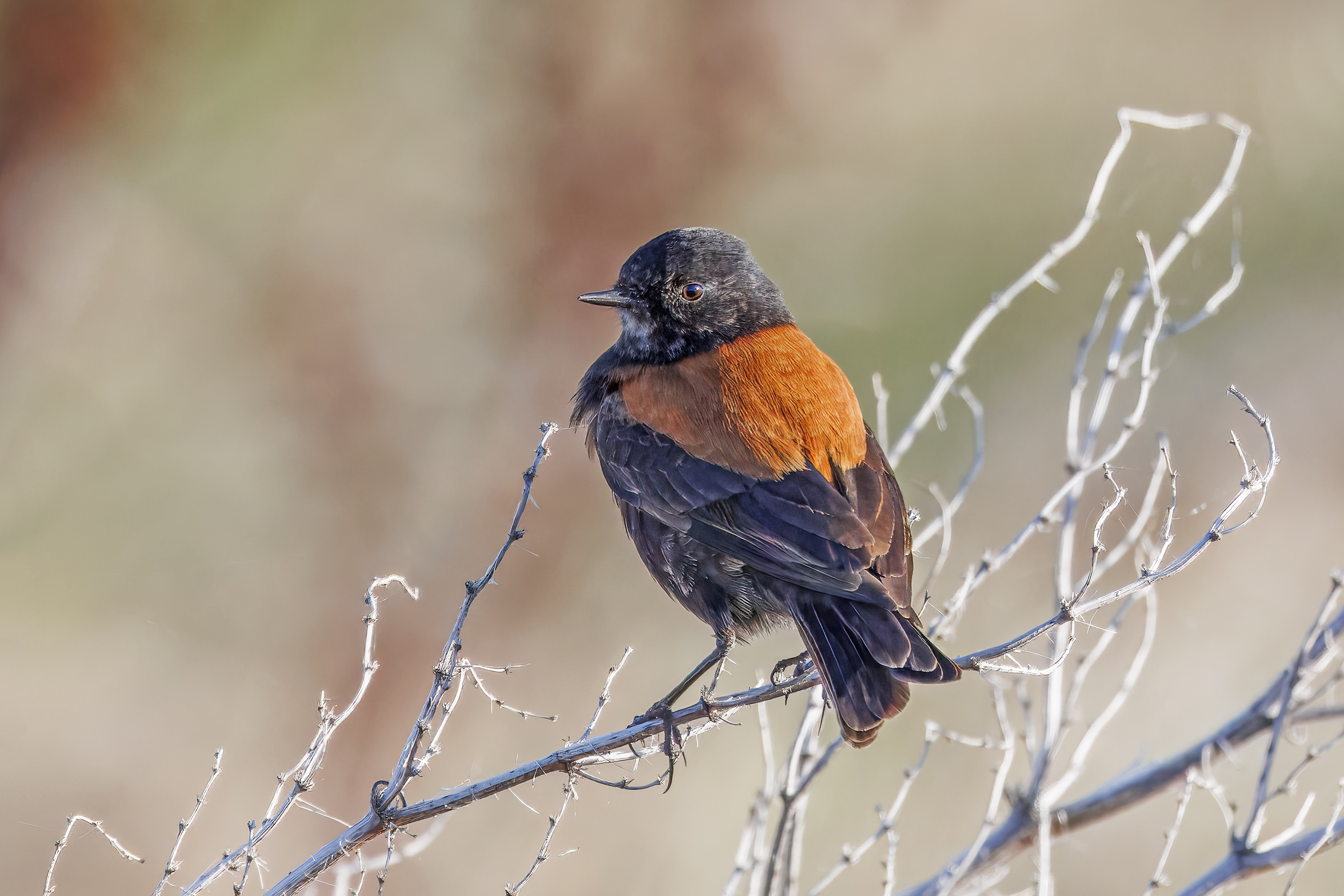
- Male, El Calafate, Argentina
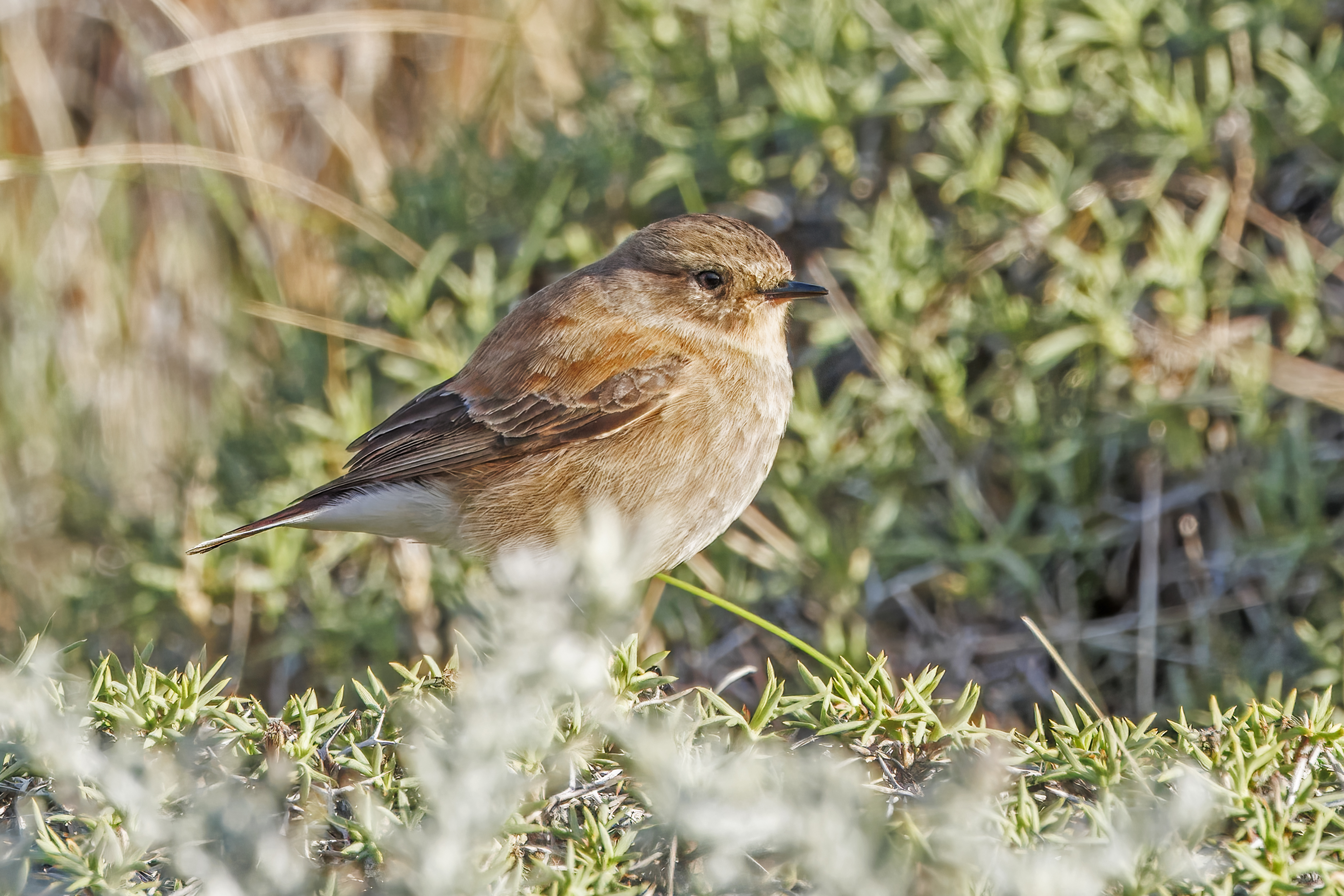
- Female, Torres del Paine, Chile

Conservation status
- Least Concern (IUCN 3.1)

Scientific classification
- Kingdom: Animalia
- Phylum: Chordata
- Class: Aves
- Order: Passeriformes
- Family: Tyrannidae
- Genus: Lessonia
- Species: L. rufa

Binomial name
- Lessonia rufa (Gmelin, JF, 1789)
- Breeding Non-Breeding

= Austral negrito =

Species of bird

The austral negrito or Patagonian negrito (Lessonia rufa) is a species of bird in the family Tyrannidae, the tyrant flycatchers. It is found in Argentina, Bolivia, Brazil, Chile, Paraguay, and Uruguay and has occurred as a vagrant in Peru and on the Falkland Islands.

== Taxonomy and systematics ==
The austral negrito was formally described in 1789 by the German naturalist Johann Friedrich Gmelin in his revised and expanded edition of Carl Linnaeus's Systema Naturae. He placed it with the larks in the genus Alauda and coined the binomial name Alauda rufa. The specific epithet is from Latin rufus meaning "red", "ruddy" or "rufous". Gmelin based his description on "L'alouette noire à dos fauve" from Buenos Aires that had been described in 1778 by the French polymath, the Comte de Buffon and illustrated with a hand-colored engraving by François-Nicolas Martinet.

The austral negrito now shares genus Lessonia with the Andean negrito (L. oreas); that genus was erected in 1832 by William Swainson. The two were long considered conspecific. Late in the twentieth century they were separated based primarily on plumage differences, and a 2014 publication added differences in feather structure and courtship displays to the evidence.

The austral negrito is monotypic.

== Description ==
The austral negrito is 11.5 to 12.5 cm (4.5 to 4.9 in) long. Adult males are mostly black with a rufous-chestnut back. Their flight feathers are black without the pale inner webs that the Andean negrito has. Adult females are smaller than males. They have a brownish gray crown, a white supercilium and cheek, and a dark brown "collar" on their nape and upper back. Their lower back is dull rufous-brown. Their wings and tail are black with whitish edges on the outer web of the outermost tail feathers. Their chin is whitish, their breast buffy white with grayish brown streaks, their flanks and belly buff, and their vent area whitish. Juveniles are similar to adult females but with a more rufescent back. Both sexes have a dark iris and a short black bill. Their legs and feet are black with exceptionally long hindclaws like those of a pipit.

== Distribution and habitat ==
The austral negrito is found along the entire length of Chile to Cape Horn. It also is found from south-central Bolivia south through Argentina to Tierra del Fuego, across southern Paraguay, in far southern Brazil, and in Uruguay. There are records of vagrant individuals from Peru and the Falkland Islands. In addition there is one record from King George Island in the South Shetlands and one at sea near Antarctica. The austral negrito inhabits open grassy landscapes at the margins of lakes and marshes, coastal lagoons, beaches, and pastures. In elevation it mostly occurs below 1,000 m (3,300 ft) but locally is found as high as 2,000 m (6,600 ft).

== Behavior ==
=== Movement ===
The austral negrito is a complete migrant. It breeds in Chile from the Coquimbo Region south to Cape Horn and in Argentina from Mendoza and La Pampa provinces south into Tierra del Fuego. It vacates that area for the austral winter, moving north primarily to coastal northern Chile, northern Argentina, Uruguay, and southern Paraguay and Bolivia. Males leave the breeding grounds before females and single-sex migrant flocks have been noted. It also winters in far southern Brazil and a few individuals have also reached southern Peru.

=== Feeding ===
The austral negrito feeds primarily on insects. The vagrant King George Island bird was seen feeding on algae in addition to taking insects from under it. The species is mostly terrestrial but will often perch on rocks, low bushes, and fences. It mostly forages in pairs during the breeding season and often in small flocks on the wintering grounds. It typically catches prey between runs on the ground. It has been observed following livestock and people in pastures, apparently to catch insects disturbed by them.

=== Breeding ===
The austral negrito breeds between September and November in mainland Chile, October to January on Tierra del Fuego, and October to January in Argentina. Males make a fluttering display flight as high as 10 to 15 m (35 to 50 ft) above the ground. The species' nest is an open cup made from grass and other fibers lined with feathers. It is placed on the ground or on a cliff ledge and often hidden by vegetation. The clutch is two to four eggs. Females alone attend nestlings. The incubation period, time to fledging, and other details of parental care are not known.

=== Vocalization ===
The austral negrito is not highly vocal. Its alarm call is "a repeated tjit-tjit" and its contact call "a short twitter". Males call "sipsipsipsip-sereen" during their display flight.

== Status ==
The IUCN has assessed the austral negrito as being of Least Concern. It has a large range; its population size is not known and is believed to be stable. No immediate threats have been identified. It is considered fairly common to locally abundant and "increasingly common in [the southern] part of range". It occurs in all of the national parks in the Patagonian Andes.
