= Croisilles Harbour =

Coordinates: 41°03′40″S 173°37′50″E

Croisilles Harbour (formerly spelt Croixelles Harbour) is a natural inlet north of Nelson at the westernmost edge of the Marlborough Sounds on the northern coast of New Zealand's South Island. It has two major arms, Ōkiwi Bay and Squally Cove.

The inlet was named by early explorer Dumont D'Urville after his mother's home village of Croisilles, Calvados.
