= Croisilles, Calvados =

Croisilles
- Commune
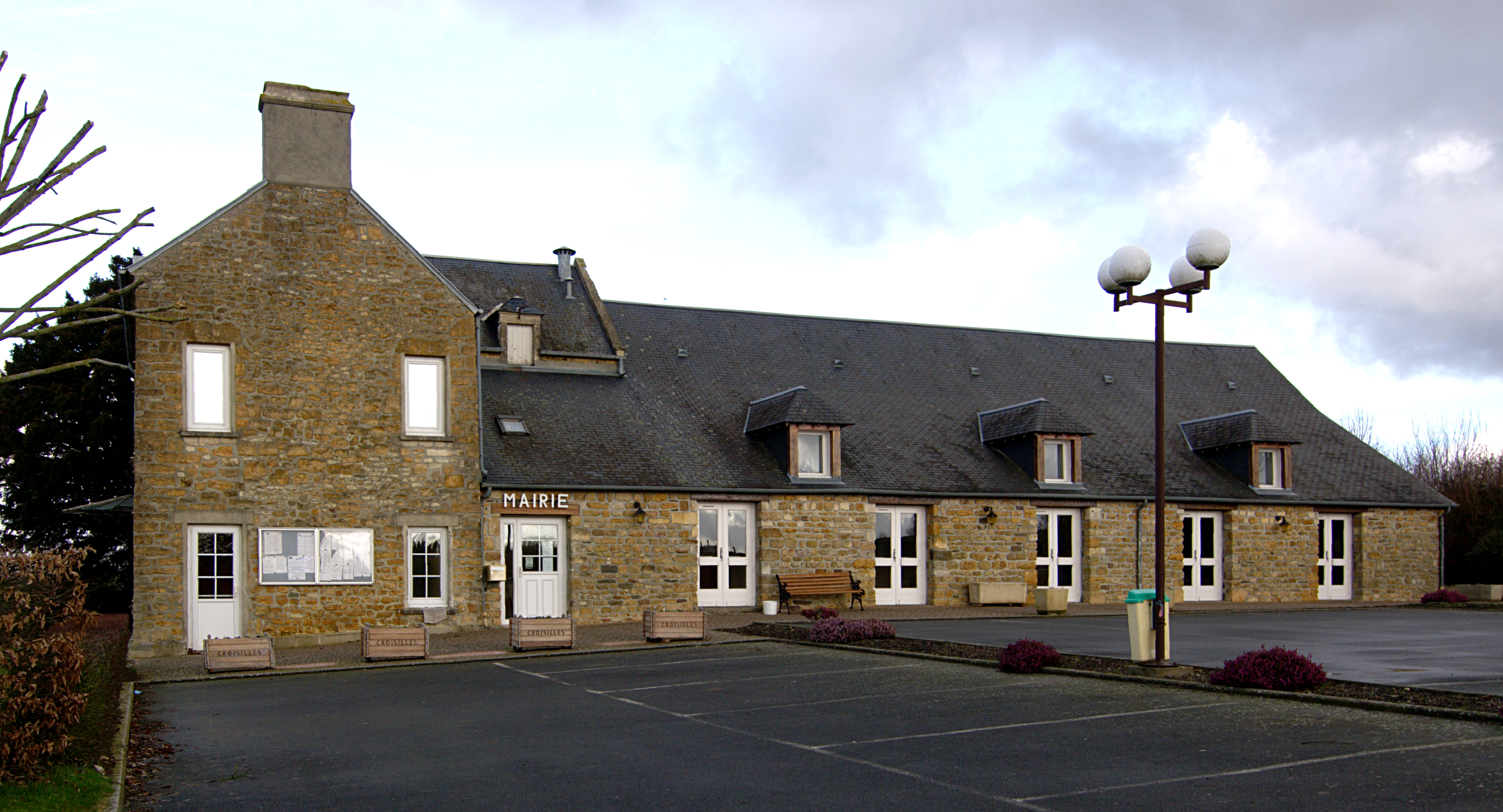
- Town hall
- Location of Croisilles
- Location within France Location within Normandy
- Coordinates: 48°59′54″N 0°26′35″W
- Country: France
- Region: Normandy
- Department: Calvados
- Arrondissement: Caen
- Canton: Le Hom
- Intercommunality: Cingal-Suisse Normande

Government
  - Mayor (2020–2026): Élisabeth Mailloux
- Area^{1}: 10.23 km^{2} (3.95 sq mi)
- Elevation: 27 m (89 ft)
- Highest elevation: 182 m (597 ft)
- Lowest elevation: 16 m (52 ft)
- Population (2023): 645
  - Density: 63.0/km^{2} (163/sq mi)
- Time zone: UTC+01:00 (CET)
  - Summer (DST): UTC+02:00 (CEST)
- INSEE/Postal code: 14207 /14220
- ^{1} French Land Register data, which excludes lakes, ponds, glaciers > 1 km^{2} (0.386 sq mi or 247 acres) and river estuaries.

Croisilles (French pronunciation: [kʁwazij]) is a commune in the Calvados department in the Normandy region in northwestern France.

The mother of explorer Dumont D'Urville was born in Croisilles. He named an inlet of New Zealand's coast Croisilles Harbour after the village.

== Geography ==
The commune is part of the area known as Suisse Normande.

The commune is made up of the following collection of villages and hamlets, Le Breuil, L'Église, La Vallée and Croisilles.

The commune is drained by the river Orne, the ruisseau de Traspy and a number of smaller streams.

== Population ==
Historical population
| Year | Pop. | ±% p.a. |
|---|---|---|
| 1968 | 279 | — |
| 1975 | 318 | +1.89% |
| 1982 | 324 | +0.27% |
| 1990 | 393 | +2.44% |
| 1999 | 404 | +0.31% |
| 2007 | 469 | +1.88% |
| 2012 | 583 | +4.45% |
| 2017 | 646 | +2.07% |
| 2023 | 645 | −0.03% |
Source: INSEE

== Points of interest ==
=== National heritage sites ===
- Saint-Martin Church is a thirteenth century church which was listed as a Monument historique in 1933.

== See also ==
- Communes of the Calvados department
