= René Lesson =

French surgeon, naturalist, ornithologist, and herpetologist (1794–1849)

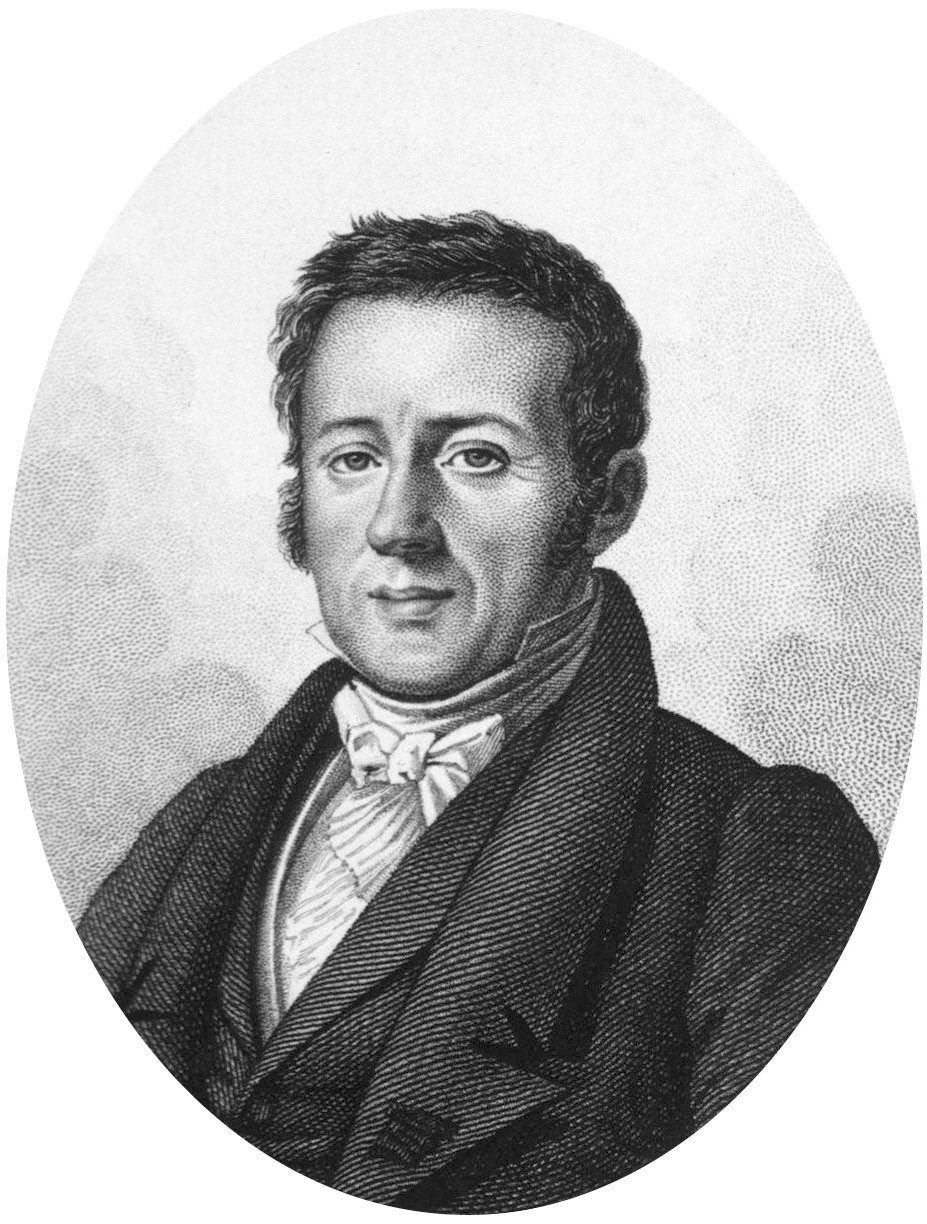
- Portrait of Lesson by Tardieu (1827)
- Born: 20 March 1794; Rochefort, Charente-Maritime, France
- Died: 28 April 1849 (aged 55); Rochefort, Charente-Maritime, France
- Known for: Les trochilidées ou les colibris et les oiseaux-mouches (1832) and other monographs on hummingbirds
- Spouse: Marie Clémence Lesson
- Relatives: Pierre Adolphe Lesson (brother)
- Awards: Légion d'honneur, 1847
- Scientific career
- Fields: Surgeon, pharmacist, naturalist, ornithologist, herpetologist
- Author abbrev. (zoology): Lesson

René Primevère Lesson (French pronunciation: [ʁəne pʁimvɛʁ lɛsɔ̃]; 20 March 1794 – 28 April 1849) was a French surgeon, naturalist, ornithologist, and herpetologist.

== Biography ==
Lesson was born at Rochefort, and entered the Naval Medical School in Rochefort at the age of sixteen. He served in the French Navy during the Napoleonic Wars; in 1811, he was third surgeon on the frigate Saale, and in 1813, was second surgeon on the Regulus.

In 1816, Lesson changed his classification to pharmacist. He served on Duperrey's round-the-world voyage of La Coquille (1822–1825), of which he collected natural history specimens with his fellow surgeon Prosper Garnot and officer Dumont d'Urville. During his visits to the Moluccas and New Guinea, Lesson became the first naturalist to see birds of paradise in the wild.

On returning to Paris, he spent seven years preparing the section on vertebrates for the official account of the expedition: "Voyage autour du monde entrepris par ordre du Gouvernement sur la corvette La Coquille" (published from 1826 to 1839). During this time period, he also produced "Manuel d'Ornithologie" (1828), "Traité d'Ornithologie" (1831), "Centurie Zoologique" (1830–1832) and "Illustrations de Zoologie" (1832–35). Lesson also published several monographs on hummingbirds and one book on birds of paradise:

- Histoire naturelle des oiseaux-mouches. ouvrage orné de planches... (1829–1831).
- Histoire naturelle des Colibris suivie d'un supplement a l'histoire naturelle des oiseaux-mouches (1831–32).
- Les trochilidées ou les colibris et les oiseaux-mouches (1832).
- Histoire naturelle des oiseaux de paradis et des épimaques; ouvrage orné de planches, dessinées et gravées par les meilleurs artistes (1835).

In the field of herpetology he described many new species of amphibians and reptiles.

On 3 February 1827, he married the artist and scientific illustrator Clémence Dumont de Sainte-Croix. Dumont de Sainte-Croix along with her sister Zoë Dumont de Sainte-Croix illustrated plates in Lesson's publications.

From 1831, he served as a professor of pharmacy, and following a series of promotions, became the top-ranking naval pharmacist at Rochefort (1835). His experience as a ship's surgeon resulted in his two-volume "Manuel d'histoire naturelle medicale, et de pharmacographie" (1833), intended as a handbook for naval surgeons.

He became a corresponding member of the Académie de Médecine in 1828, later becoming a correspondent of the Académie des Sciences (1833). He received the Légion d'honneur in 1847.

In 1847, Lesson presented a division of human races based on simple colour terms: White for Caucasians, Dusky for South Asians, Orange for Austronesians, Yellow for East Asians, Red for Indigenous Americans, and Black for Africans. This model achieved moderate use among ethnologists.

René Primevère Lesson is sometimes confused with his brother, Pierre Adolphe Lesson (1805–1888), who participated on the Astrolabe expedition (as the Coquille had been renamed) in 1826–29, under the command of Jules Dumont d'Urville.

== Taxa described by Lesson ==
- See Category:Taxa named by René Lesson

=== Amphibian and reptile species described by Lesson ===
listed in the order they were described (only species still recognized are listed)

- Litoria aurea (Lesson, 1826) as Rana aurea (green and golden bell frog)
- Pleurodema thaul (Lesson, 1826) as Bufo thaul (Chile four-eyed frog)
- Hylarana papua (Lesson, 1826) as Rana papua (Papua River frog)
- Emoia cyanura (Lesson, 1826) as Scincus cyanurus (copper-tailed emo skink)
- Lamprolepis smaragdina (Lesson, 1826) as Hinulia smaragdina (emerald tree skink)
- Liolaemus chiliensis (Lesson, 1826) as Calotes chiliensis (Chilean tree lizard)
- Ornithuroscincus noctua (Lesson, 1826) as Scincus noctua (moth skink)
- Varanus douarrha (Lesson, 1830)
- Emoia atrocostata (Lesson, 1830) as Scincus atrocostatus (mangrove skink)
- Emoia cyanogaster (Lesson, 1830) as Scincus cyanogaster (green-bellied emo skink)
- Enyalius brasiliensis (Lesson, 1830) as Lophurus brasiliensis (Brazilian fathead anole)
- Gehyra oceanica (Lesson, 1830) as Gecko oceanicus (oceanic gecko)
- Microlophus peruvianus (Lesson, 1830) as Stellio peruvianus (Peruvian coastal lizard)
- Micropechis ikaheca (Lesson, 1830) as Coluber ikaheka (New Guinea small-eyed snake)
- Naja kaouthia (Lesson, 1831) (monocled cobra)
- Crocodylus palustris (Lesson, 1831) (mugger crocodile)
- Euphlyctis hexadactylus (Lesson, 1834) as Rana hexadactyla (Indian bullfrog)
- Draco lineatus (Lesson, 1834) (Buru flying lizard)

=== Fish described by Lesson ===
- Scarus taeniopterus (Lesson 1829)
- Acanthurus bariene (Lesson 1831)
- Abantennarius coccineus (Lesson 1831)
- Arothron mappa (Lesson 1831)
- Triodon macropterus (Lesson 1829)
- Nebrius ferrugineus (Lesson 1831)
- Scuticaria tigrina (Lesson 1828)

== Lesson and the idea that counting in New Zealand proceeded by elevens ==
On his return from his voyage on the Coquille in 1825, Lesson published a French translation of "Du Grand Océan, de ses îles et de ses côtes" written by the German botanist Adelbert von Chamisso. In the article, von Chamisso had claimed that the number system of New Zealand was based on twenty: "…de l'E. de la mer du Sud … c'est là qu'on trouve premierement le système arithmétique fondé sur un échelle de vingt, comme dans la Nouvelle-Zélande (2)..." […east of the South Sea … is where we first find the arithmetic system based on a scale of twenty, as in New Zealand (2)...]. Lesson inserted the footnote (2) to mark this claim as an error: "(2) Erreur. Le système arithmétique des Zélandais est undécimal, et les Anglais sont les premiers qui ont propagé cette fausse idée. (L.)" [(2) Error. The Zealander arithmetic system is undecimal, and the English are the first to propagate this misconception. (L).]" The term "undécimal" was possibly a printer's error that conjoined the phrase "un decimal," which would have correctly identified the New Zealand number system as decimal. Undecimal was interpreted to mean "counting by elevens," as a parallel construction to the term "duodecimal" for twelve-based counting. The mention of "the English" likely referred to Samuel Lee and Thomas Kendall, as their 1820 grammar of the New Zealand language had been von Chamisso's source.

Regardless of whether his 1825 use of "undécimal" originated as a printer's error or not, over the next several years, Lesson and his friend and shipmate Jules de Blosseville would deliberately embellish and attempt to establish as fact the idea that New Zealand had a base 11 number system. The idea was published in 1826 by the Italian geographer Adriano Balbi as the contents of a letter he received from Lesson, a missive that added an elevens-based numerical vocabulary (including terms meaning eleven squared and cubed) and details of its purported collection from New Zealand informants. It was again mentioned in 1826 by the Hungarian astronomer Franz Xaver von Zach, who reported it thirdhand as a letter written by Blosseville: "M. Nell de Bréanté écrit que, d'après les communications qu'il a reçues de M. de Blosseville, ... [en Nouvelle-Zélande], on a trouvé en usage un système de numération undécimal" [Mr. Nell de Bréauté writes that, according to the communications he has received from M. de Blosseville, ... [in New Zealand], a system of undecimal numbering was found in use]. Lesson was also likely to have authored an undated, anonymous essay found among and published with the papers of the Prussian linguist Wilhelm von Humboldt in 1839. The essay contains the most extensive detail of the known sources, mentioning Thomas Kendall by name and listing several North Island locations where the alleged informants were supposedly from, matters that would have been known to Lesson from his work and 1824 visit to that island.

== Taxa named after Lesson ==
=== Algae ===
- Lessonia is a genus of large kelp native to the southern Pacific Ocean that was named in René Lesson's honour in 1825.
- Lessoniopsis (a brown algae) (Reinke 1903) was named after Lesson in 1903.

=== Birds ===
- Lessonia Swainson, 1832
- Mayrornis lessoni (G. R. Gray, 1846)
- Pterodroma lessonii (Garnot, 1826)

=== Fish ===
- Plectorhinchus lessonii (Cuvier, 1830)

== Bibliography ==
=== By Lesson ===
- Manuel d'ornithologie, ou Description des genres et des principales espèces d'oiseaux, deux volumes, Roret, Paris, 1828.
- Histoire naturelle des oiseaux-mouches : ouvrage orné de planches dessinées et gravées par les meilleurs artistes, deux volumes, Arthus Bertrand, Paris, 1829.
- Histoire naturelle des colibris, suivie d'un supplément à l'histoire naturelle des oiseaux-mouches. Ouvrage orné de planches dessinées et gravées par les meilleurs artistes, et dédié à M. le baron Cuvier, Arthus Bertrand, Paris, 1830–1831.
- Centurie zoologique, ou, Choix d'animaux rares, nouveaux ou imparfaitement connus: enrichi de planches inédites, dessinées d'après nature par M. Prêtre, gravées et coloriées avec le plus grand soin, F.G. Levrault, Bruxelles, 1830–1832.
- Traité d'ornithologie, ou Tableau méthodique des ordres, sous-ordres, familles, tribus, genres, sous-genres et races d'oiseaux, Levrault, Paris, 1831.
- Illustrations de zoologie, ou, Recueil de figures d'animaux peintes d'après nature, Arthus Bertrand, Paris, 1831–1835.
- Manuel d'Histoire Naturelle Médicale, et de Pharmacographie, ou tábleau synoptique, méthodique et descriptif des produits que la médecine et les arts empruntent à l'histoire naturelle, Roret, Paris, 1833.
- Flore rochefortine, ou Description des plantes qui croissent spontanément ou qui sont naturalisées aux environs de la ville de Rochefort, [s.n.] Rochefort, 1835.
- Histoire naturelle générale et particulière des mammifères et des oiseaux découverts depuis la mort de Buffon, Pourrat Frères, Paris, 1834–1836.
- Prodrome d'une monographie des méduses, Rochefort, Paris, 1837
- Voyage autour du monde, entrepris par ordre du gouvernement sur la Corvette La Coquille, Pourrat frères, Paris, 1838–1839.
- Species des mammifères bimanes et quadrumanes, suivi d'un mémoire sur les Oryctéropes, J.-B. Baillière, Paris, 1840.
- Les trochilidées ou Les colibris et les oiseaux-mouches : suivis d'un index général, dans lequel sont décrites et classées méthodiquement toutes les races et espèces du genre trochilus, Arthus Bertrand, Paris, 1840.
- Moeurs, instinct et singularités de la vie des Animaux Mammifères, Paulin, Paris, 1842.
- Fastes historiques. Archéologie, bibliographie, etc. du département de la Charente-Inférieure, coll. Gustav. Bord., Rochefort, 1842.
- Histoire naturelle des zoophytes. Acalèphes, deux volumes, Roret, Paris, 1843.
- Notice historique sur l'amiral Dumont d'Urville,... Mémoire envoyé au concours ouvert par l'Académie de Caen en 1844, H. Loustau, Rochefort, 1844.
- Description de mammifères et d'oiseaux récemment découverts; précédée d'un Tableau sur les races humaines, Lévêque, Paris, Veith, Carlsruhe, F. Bélisard, Pétersbourg, 1847.
- Nouveau manuel complet de l'éleveur d'oiseaux de volière et de cage ou Guide de l'oiselier : contenant la description des genres et des principales espèces d'oiseaux indigènes et exotiques, nouveau édition, Roret, Paris, 1867.

=== About Lesson ===
- Baillière, J.B. (1840). Species des mammifères bimanes et quadrumanes; suivi d'un mémoire sur les Oryctéropes, Paris.
- Duquy, Raymond (1995). René Primevère Lesson. Un voyage autour du monde. in Aventures scientifiques. Savants en Poitou-Charentes du XVIe au XXe siècle (DHOMBRES J., dir.), Les éditions de l’Actualité Poitou-Charentes (Poitiers) : 136–147. ISBN 2-911320-00-X
- Lefèvre, M. A. (1850). Élogie historique de R.-P. Lesson. Rochefort, France: Henry Loustau.
- Rallet, Louis. (1953). Un naturaliste saintongeais: René-Primevère Lesson (1794–1849). Annales de La Société des Sciences Naturelles de la Charente-Maritime, vol. III, no. 8, pp. 77–131.

== See also ==
- European and American voyages of scientific exploration
- Alleged use of undecimal numbers by the Māori
