= Jules Dumont d'Urville =

French explorer and naval officer (1790–1842)

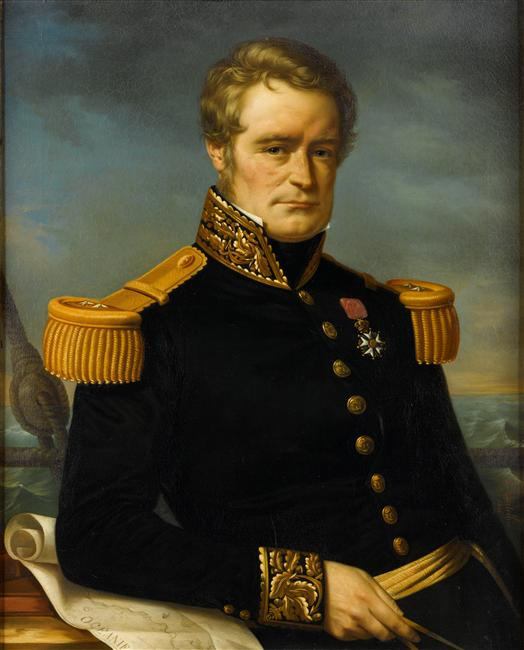
- Born: 23 May 1790; Condé-sur-Noireau, Kingdom of France
- Died: 8 May 1842 (aged 51); Meudon, Kingdom of France
- Burial place: Montparnasse Cemetery
- Spouse: Adèle Pépin
- Relatives: Gabriel Charles François Dumont
- Military career
- Allegiance: First French Empire; Bourbon Restoration; July Monarchy
- Branch: French Navy
- Rank: Rear Admiral
- Commands: Astrolabe

Jules Sébastien César Dumont d'Urville (French pronunciation: [ʒyl dymɔ̃ dyʁvil]; 23 May 1790 – 8 May 1842) was a French explorer and naval officer who explored the south and western Pacific, Australia, New Zealand and Antarctica. As a botanist and cartographer, he gave his name to several seaweeds, plants and shrubs and to places such as d'Urville Island in New Zealand.

== Early life and education ==
Dumont was born at Condé-sur-Noireau in Lower Normandy. His father, Gabriel Charles François Dumont, sieur d'Urville (1728–1796), Bailiff of Condé-sur-Noireau, was, like his ancestors, responsible to the court of Condé.

His mother Jeanne Françoise Victoire Julie (1754–1832) came from Croisilles, Calvados, and was a rigid and formal woman from an ancient family of the rural nobility of Lower Normandy. The child was weak and often sickly.

After the death of his father when he was six, his mother's brother, the Abbot of Croisilles, played the part of his father and from 1798 took charge of his education. The Abbot taught him Latin, Greek, rhetoric and philosophy. From 1804 Dumont studied at the lycée Impérial in Caen.

In the library of Caen, he read the Encyclopédistes and the reports of travel of Bougainville, Cook and Anson, and he became passionate about these matters.

At the age of 17 years he failed the physical tests of the entrance exam to the École polytechnique and he therefore decided to enlist in the navy. (Note: This was to the relief of his mother, who disapproved the idea of her son entering a lay institution characterised by "...maîtres athées, promiscuité des condisciples venus de tous les milieux, contagion des idées philosophiques et révolutionnaires..." ("atheistic teachers, the promiscuity of school-fellows from all parts of society, the contagion of philosophical and revolutionary ideas") (Guillon 1986))

== Military career ==
In 1807, Dumont was admitted to the École navale at Brest where he presented himself as a timid young man, very serious and studious, little interested in amusements and much more interested in studies than in military matters. In 1808, he obtained the grade of first-class candidate.

At the time the neglected French navy was of a much lower quality than Napoleon's Grande Armée, and its ships were blockaded in their ports by the absolute domination of the British Royal Navy. Dumont was confined to land like his colleagues and spent the first years in the navy studying foreign languages.

In 1812, after having been promoted to ensign and finding himself bored with port life and disapproving of the dissolute behaviour of the other young officers, he asked to be transferred to Toulon on board the Suffren; but this ship was also blockaded in port.

During this period, Dumont built on his already substantial cultural knowledge. He already spoke, in addition to Latin and Greek, English, German, Italian, Russian, Chinese and Hebrew. During his later travels in the Pacific, thanks to his prodigious memory, he would acquire some knowledge of an immense number of dialects of Polynesia and Melanesia. Meanwhile, ashore at Toulon, he learnt about botany and entomology in long excursions in the hills of Provence and he studied in the nearby naval observatory.

Finally in 1814, when Napoleon had been exiled to Elba, Dumont undertook his first short navigation of the Mediterranean Sea. In 1815, he married Adèle Pépin, daughter of a clockmaker from Toulon. who was openly disliked by Dumont's mother, who thought her inappropriate for her son and refused to meet her.

=== In the Aegean Sea ===
In 1819, Dumont d'Urville sailed on board Chevrette, under the command of Captain Gauttier-Duparc, to carry out a hydrographic survey of the islands of the Greek archipelago. During a pause near the island of Milos, the local French representative brought to Dumont's attention the rediscovery of a marble statue a few days before (8 April 1820) by a local peasant. The statue, now known as the Venus de Milo, dates from around the year 130 BC.

Dumont recognised its value and would have acquired it immediately, but the ship's commander pointed out that there was not enough space on board for an object of its size. Moreover, the expedition was likely to proceed through stormy seas that could damage it. Dumont then wrote to the French ambassador to Constantinople about its discovery. (Note: ”... je fus le premier à en remettre une description détaillée à M. le marquis de Rivière, à Constantinople. Grâce à son empressement, à son amour pour les beaux arts et aux efforts de M. de Marcellus, la France n'a pas eu le regret de voir passer en mains étrangères ce précieux reste d'antiquité...” (“…I was the first one to supply a detailed description to the M. le marquis de Rivière, in Constantinople. Thanks to his enthusiasm, his love of fine arts and to the efforts of M. de Marcellus, France has been able to avoid the regret to see this precious piece of antiquity pass into foreign hands…”) Note on the underground galleries of the island of Milos, by J. Dumont d’Urville, in Nouvelles annales des voyages, de géographie et de histoire, volume XXVII. Paris: Gide, 1825.(in French)) Chevrette arrived in Constantinople on 22 April and Dumont succeeded in convincing the ambassador to acquire the statue.

Meanwhile, the peasant had sold the statue to a priest, Macario Verghis, who wished to present it as a gift to an interpreter for the Sultan in Constantinople. The French ambassador's representative arrived just as the statue was being loaded aboard a ship bound for Constantinople and persuaded the island's primates (chief citizens) to annul the sale and honour the first offer. This earned Dumont the title of Chevalier (knight) of the Légion d'honneur, the attention of the French Academy of Sciences and promotion to lieutenant; and France gained a new, magnificent statue for the Louvre in Paris. (Note: In fact, the recovery of the Venus de Milo was not the work of Dumont only. Moreover, the French ambassador to Constantinople had already received another report on the discovery of the statue sent by the commander of the ship Estafette in the roadstead of Milossome to the French consul to Smyrna.)

=== Voyage of Coquille ===
On his return from the voyage of Chevrette, Dumont was sent to the naval archive, where he encountered Lieutenant Louis-Isidore Duperrey, a past acquaintance. The two began to plan an expedition of exploration in the Pacific, (Note: Some years earlier Dumont was an unsuccessful candidate to take part in the voyage of the ship Uranie, under the command of Louis de Freycinet. His failure to gain a place on that voyage became for him a personal issue and influenced his later behaviour.) an area out of which France had been forced during the Napoleonic Wars. France considered it might be able to regain some of its losses by taking over part of New South Wales. On 11 August 1822, the ship Coquille sailed from Toulon with the objective of collecting as much scientific and strategic information as possible on the area to which it was dispatched. Duperrey was named Commander of the expedition because he was four years older than Dumont. On the second voyage of the Astrolabe in 1840, Dumont discovered the Adélie penguin, which is named after his wife.

René-Primevère Lesson travelled on Coquille as a naval doctor and naturalist. On the return to France in March 1825, Lesson and Dumont brought an imposing collection of animals and plants collected on the Falkland Islands, on the coasts of Chile and Peru, in the archipelagos of the Pacific and New Zealand, New Guinea, and Australia. Dumont was now 35 and in poor health. On board Coquille, he had behaved as a competent official, but disinclined to military discipline and subordination. On the return to France, Duperrey and Dumont were promoted to commander.

==== Collection ====
On Coquille, Dumont tried to reconcile his responsibilities as second in command with his need to carry out scientific work. He was in charge of carrying out research in the fields of botany and entomology. La Coquille brought back to France specimens of more than 3,000 species of plants, 400 of which were previously unknown, enriching moreover the Muséum national d'histoire naturelle in Paris with more than 1,200 specimens of insects, covering 1,100 insect species (including 300 previously unknown species). The scientists Georges Cuvier and François Arago analysed the results of his searches and praised Dumont.

As a botanist and cartographer, Dumont d'Urville left his mark on New Zealand. He gave his name to the genus of seaweeds Durvillaea, which includes southern bull-kelp; the seaweed Grateloupia urvilleana; the species of grass tree Dracophyllum urvilleanum; the shrub Hebe urvilleana and the buttercup Ranunculus urvilleanus.

=== First voyage of Astrolabe ===
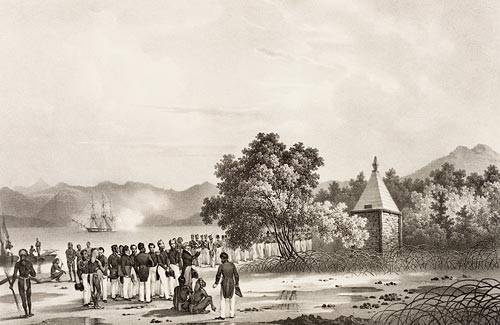
Inauguration of the monument erected in honour of La Pérouse, shipwrecked and lost on the island of Vanikoro.

Two months after Dumont d'Urville returned on La Coquille, he presented to the Navy Ministry a plan for a new expedition, which he hoped to command, as his relationship with Duperrey had deteriorated. The proposal was accepted and La Coquille was renamed the Astrolabe in honour of one of the ships of La Pérouse, and sailed from Toulon on 22 April 1826, towards the Pacific Ocean, for a circumnavigation of the world that was destined to last nearly three years.

The new Astrolabe skirted the coast of southern Australia, carried out new relief maps of the South Island of New Zealand, including improved surveys of the Marlborough Sounds in which he navigated through the narrow and treacherous French Pass and mapped d'Urville Island, which James Cook had mapped as being part of the mainland.

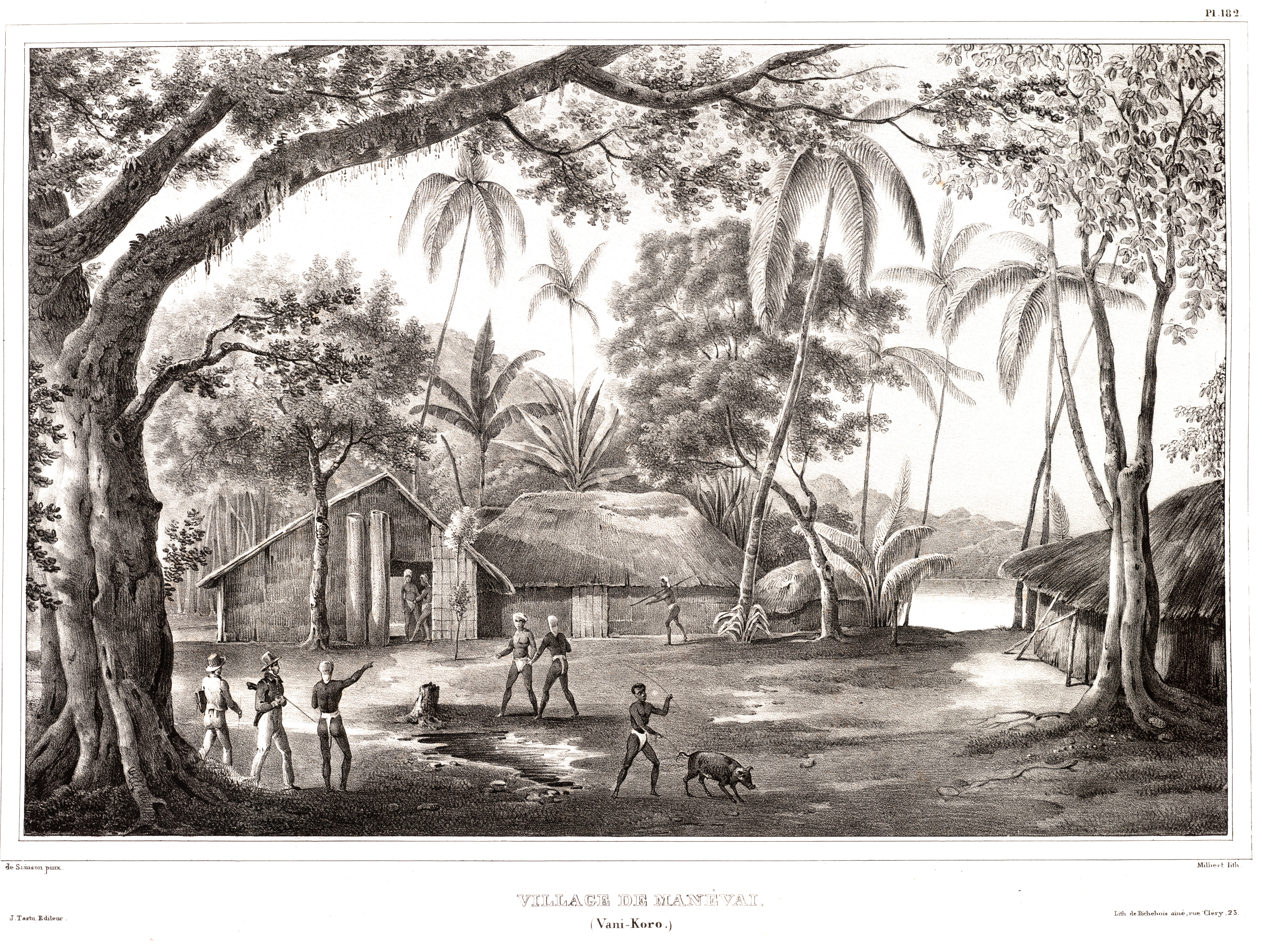
Dumont d'Urville's expedition at Vanikoro.

Astrolabe sailed up the east coast of the North Island, creating comprehensive coastline maps of New Zealand. The ship spent six days in the Bay of Islands taking on food and water before sailing for Tonga.

Astrolabe visited Fiji, then Dumont executed the first relief maps of the Loyalty Islands (part of French New Caledonia) and explored the coasts of New Guinea. He identified the site of La Pérouse's shipwreck in Vanikoro (one of the Santa Cruz Islands, part of the archipelago of the Solomon Islands) and collected numerous remains of his boats. The voyage continued with the mapping of part of the Caroline Islands and the Moluccas. Astrolabe returned to Marseille on 25 March 1829, with an impressive load of hydrographical papers and collections of zoological, botanical and mineralogical reports, which were destined to strongly influence the scientific analysis of those regions. Following this expedition, he invented the terms Malaisia, Micronesia and Melanesia, distinguishing these Pacific cultures and island groups from Polynesia.

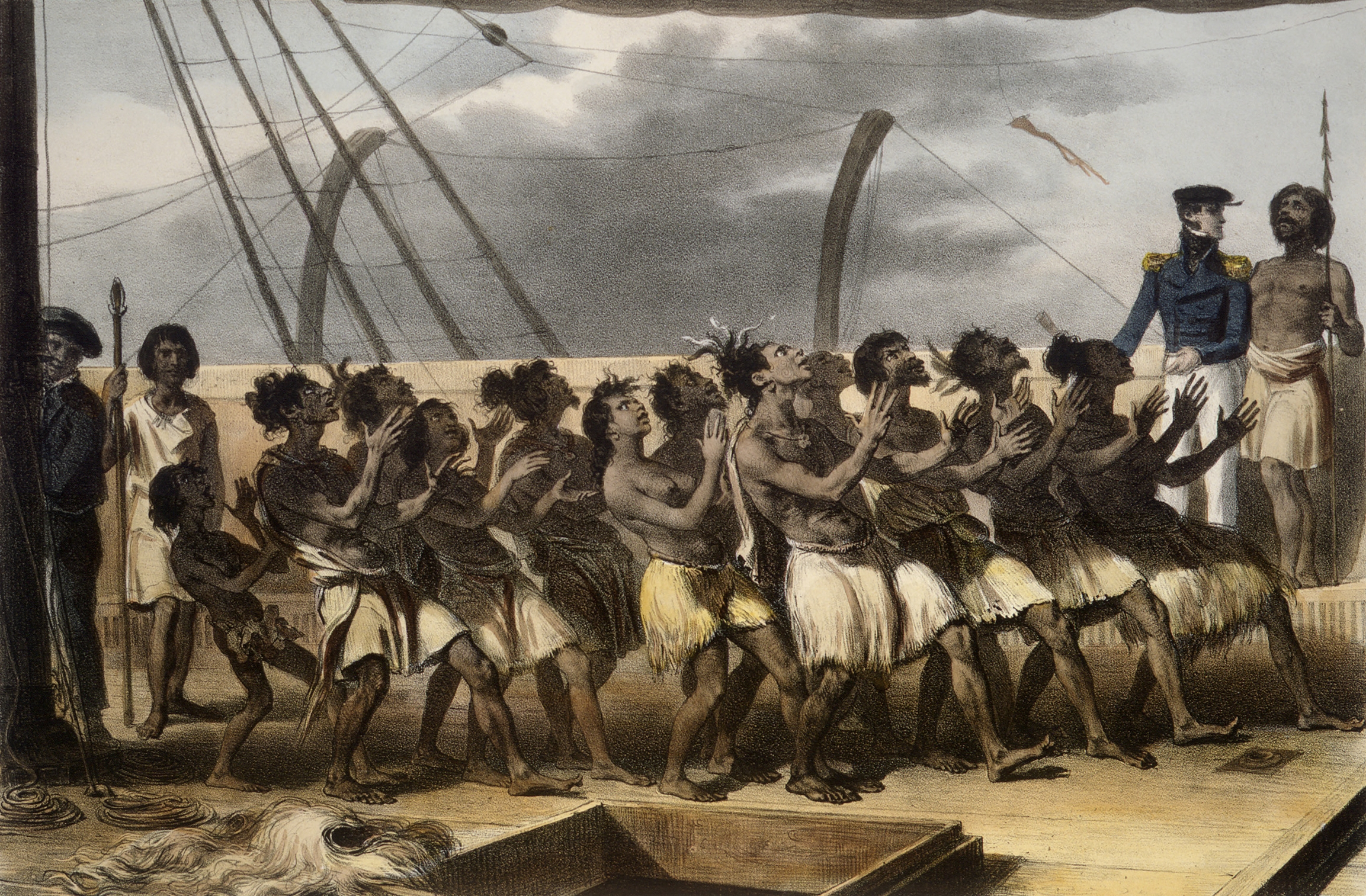
Māori men and women on board Astrolabe performing a dance, with a French officer at right.

Dumont's health was by now weakened by years of a poor diet. He suffered from kidney and stomach problems and from intense attacks of gout. During the first thirteen years of their marriage, half of which passed far apart, Adélie and Jules had two sons. The first one died at a young age while his father was aboard La Coquille and the second, also called Jules, on the return of his father after four years away.

Dumont d'Urville passed a short period with his family before returning to Paris, where he was promoted to captain and he was put in charge of writing the report of his travels. The five volumes were published at the expense of the French government between 1832 and 1834. During these years d'Urville, who was already a poor diplomat, became more irascible and rancorous as a result of his gout, and lost the sympathy of the naval leadership. In his report, he criticised harshly the military structures, his colleagues, the French Academy of Sciences and even the King – none of whom, in his opinion, had given the voyage of Astrolabe due acknowledgment.

In 1835, Dumont was directed to return to Toulon to engage in "down to earth" work and spent two years, marked by mournful events (notably the loss of a daughter from cholera) and happy events (notably the birth of another son, Émile) but with the constant and nearly obsessive thought of a third expedition to the Pacific, analogous to James Cook's third voyage. He looked again at Astrolabe's travel notes, and found a gap in the exploration of Oceania and, in January 1837, he wrote to the Navy Ministry suggesting the opportunity for a new expedition to the Pacific.

=== Second voyage of Astrolabe ===
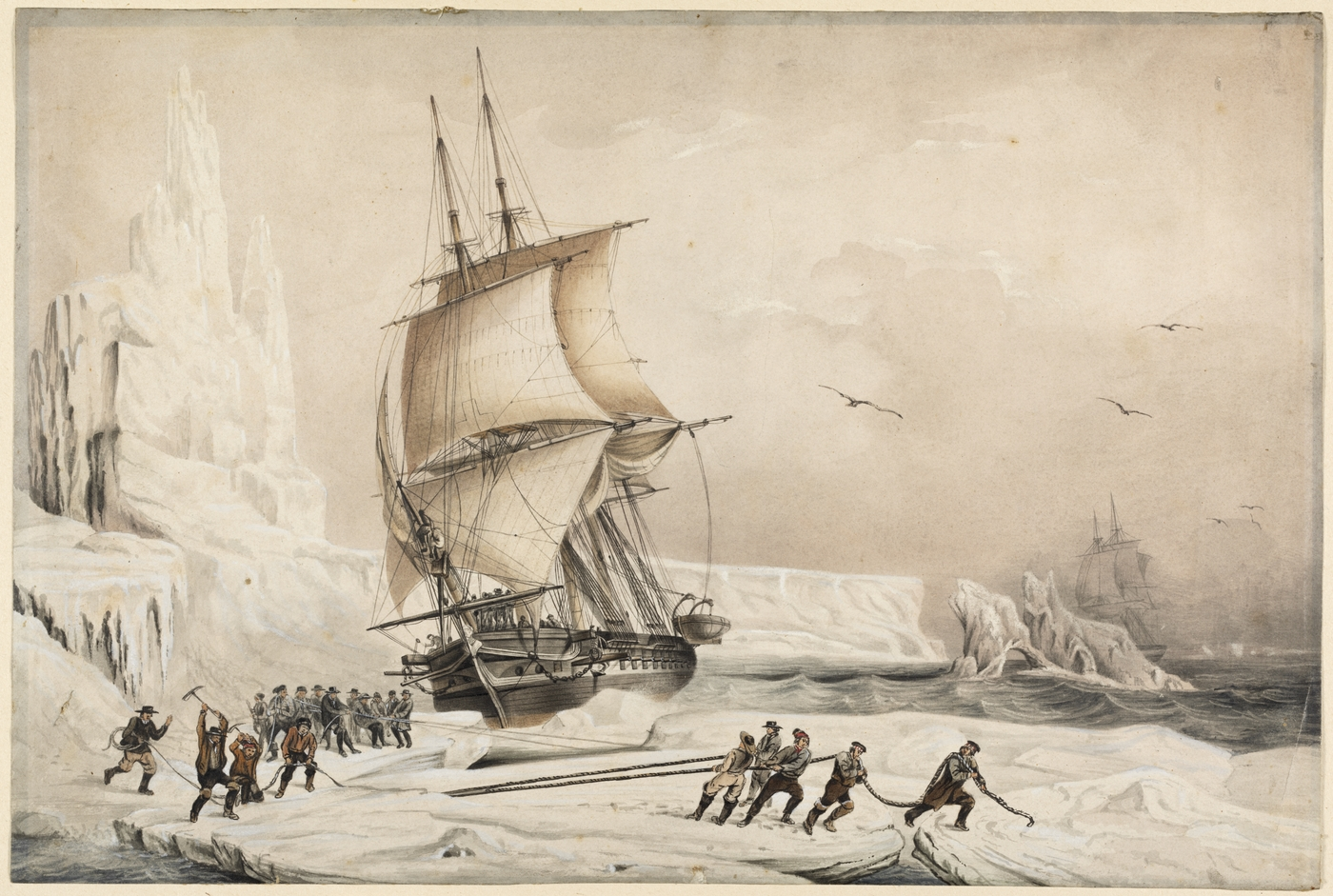
The Astrolabe and the Zelee caught in Antarctic ice, watercolour by A. Mayer. (1838)

King Louis Philippe approved the plan, but he ordered that the expedition aim for the South Magnetic Pole and to claim it for France; if that was not possible, Dumont's expedition was asked to equal the most southerly latitude of 74°34'S achieved in 1823 by James Weddell. Thus France became part of the international competition for polar exploration, along with the United States and the United Kingdom. (Note: The first British expedition was the 1839–43 voyage of James Clark Ross and Francis Crozier. The first American expedition left in 1838 and was led by Charles Wilkes after Ross’s 1831 conquest of the North magnetic pole.)

Second voyage of the Astrolabe

Dumont was initially unhappy with the modifications made to his proposal. He had little interest in polar exploration and preferred tropical routes. But soon his vanity took over and he saw the opportunity for achieving a prestigious objective. (Note: At that time national prestige derived from polar exploration in the same way that it is derived from space exploration in recent times.) The two ships, Astrolabe and Zélée were prepared for the voyage at Toulon. The Astrolabe was commanded by Dumont d'Urville, and Gaston de Roquemaurel as second, and La Zélée by Charles Hector Jacquinot. In the course of the preparation Dumont also went to London to acquire documentation and instrumentation, meeting the British Admiralty's oceanographer, Francis Beaufort and the President of the Royal Geographical Society, John Washington, both strong supporters of the British expeditions to the South Pole. (Note: In the course of his stay in London Dumont expressed doubts that he had held for a long time on Weddell’s claim to have reached 74°34'S, provoking indignant reactions.)

==== First contact with Antarctica ====
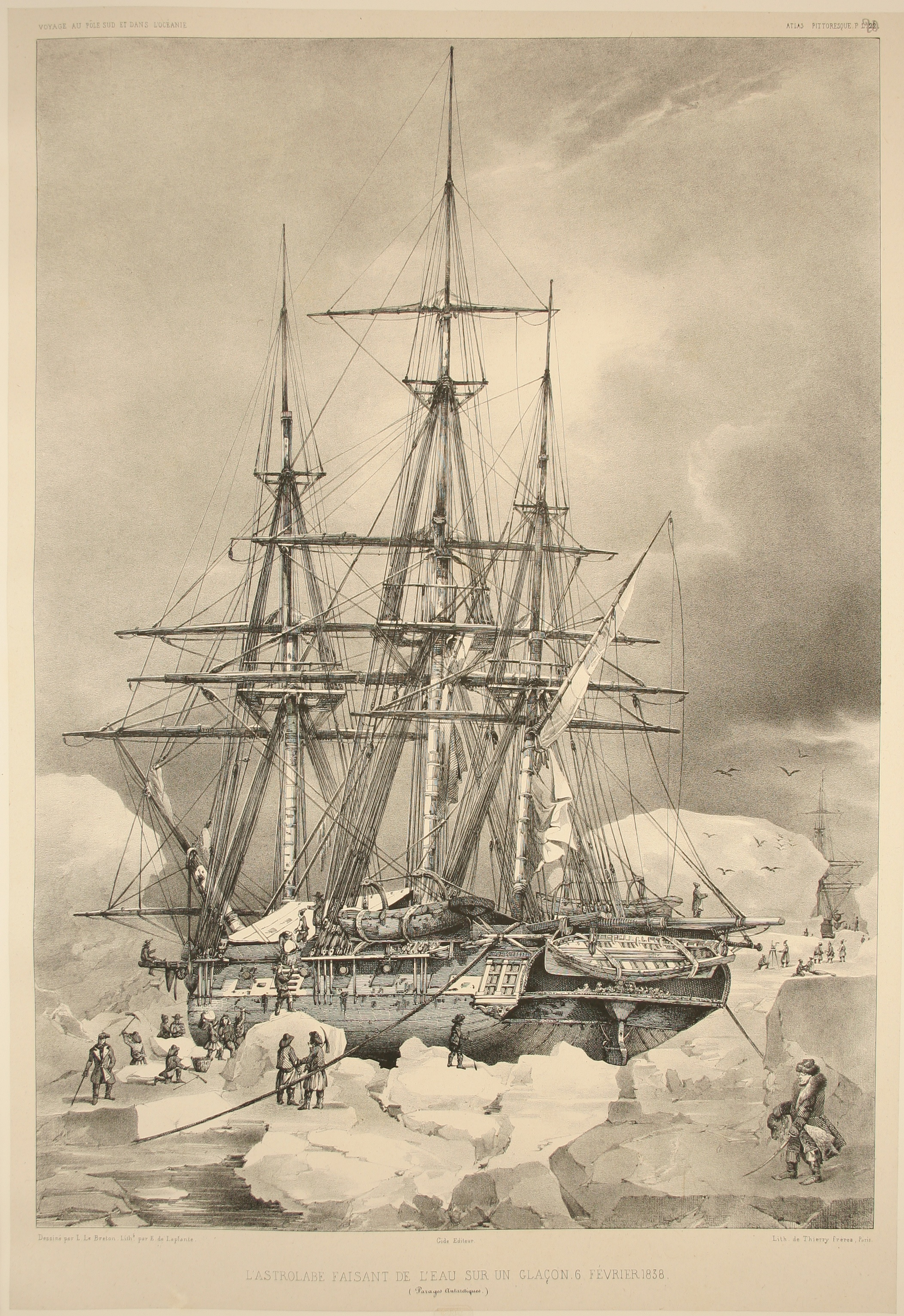
Astrolabe making water on a floe 6 February 1838

Astrolabe and Zélée sailed from Toulon on 7 September 1837, after three weeks of delay compared to Dumont's plans. His objectives were to reach the most southerly point possible at this time in the Weddell Sea; to pass through the Strait of Magellan; to travel up the coast of Chile in order to head for Oceania with the objective of inspecting the new British colonies in Western Australia; to sail to Hobart; and to sail to New Zealand to find opportunities for French whalers and to examine places where a penal colony might be established. After passing through the East Indies, the mission would have to round the Cape of Good Hope and return to France.

Early in the voyage, part of the crew was involved in a drunken brawl and arrested in Tenerife. A short pause was made in Rio de Janeiro to disembark a sick official. During the first part of the voyage there were also problems of provisioning, particularly rotten meat, which affected the health of the crew. At the end of November, the ships reached the Strait of Magellan. Dumont thought there was sufficient time to explore the strait for three weeks, taking into account the precise maps drawn by Phillip Parker King in HMS Beagle between 1826 and 1830, before heading south again.

In the Strait of Magellan Dummont surveyed the coast trying to find out the ruins of Ciudad Rey Don Felipe, a city founded in 1584 as part of a failed Spanish colonization attempt to control the passage through the strait. An expedition report recommended that a French colony be established at the strait to support future traffic along the route. The strait was eventually settled by Chile in 1843.

Two weeks after seeing their first iceberg, Astrolabe and Zélée found themselves entangled again in a mass of ice on 1 January 1838. The same night the pack ice prevented the ships from continuing to the south. In the next two months Dumont led increasingly desperate attempts to find a passage through the ice so that he could reach the desired latitude. For a while the ships managed to keep to an ice-free channel, but shortly afterwards they became trapped again, after a wind change. Five days of continuous work were necessary in order to open a corridor in the pack ice to free them.

After reaching the South Orkney Islands, the expedition headed directly to the South Shetland Islands and the Bransfield Strait separating them from Antarctica. In spite of thick fog they located some land only sketched on the maps, which Dumont named Terre de Louis-Philippe (now called Graham Land), the Joinville Island group and Rosamel Island (now called Andersson Island). (Note: These were named respectively after the French King; François d'Orléans, Prince of Joinville, son of the King; and Vice Admiral Claude Charles Marie du Campe de Rosamel, French Naval Minister.) Conditions on board had rapidly deteriorated: most of the crew had obvious symptoms of scurvy and the main decks were covered by smoke from the ships' fires and bad smells and became unbearable. At the end of February 1838, Dumont accepted that he was not able to continue further south, and he continued to doubt the actual latitude reached by Weddell. He therefore directed the two ships towards Talcahuano, in Chile, where he established a temporary hospital for the crew members affected by scurvy. (Note: 38 cases on Zélée and 20 on Astrolabe)

==== Pacific ====
During months of exploration in the Pacific, the ship visited many islands in Polynesia. On their arrival in the Marquesas Islands, the crews found ways "to socialise" with the islanders. Dumont's moral conduct was irreproachable, but he provided a highly summarised description of some incidents of their stay in Nuku Hiva in his reports. During the voyage from the East Indies to Tasmania some of the crew were lost to tropical fevers and dysentery (14 men and 3 officials); but for Dumont the worst moment during the expedition was at Valparaíso, where he received a letter from his wife that informed him of the death of his second son from cholera. Adélie's sorrowful demand that he return home coincided with a deterioration in his health: Dumont was more and more often hit by attacks of gout and stomach pains.

On 12 December 1839 the two corvettes landed at Hobart, where the sick and the dying were treated. Dumont was received by John Franklin, Governor of Tasmania and an Arctic explorer who later perished on the infamous Franklin Expedition, from whom he learned that the ships of the American expedition led by Charles Wilkes were berthed in Sydney waiting to sail south.

Seeing the consistent reduction of the crews, decimated by misfortunes, Dumont expressed his intention to leave this time for the Antarctic with Astrolabe only, in order to attempt to reach the South Magnetic Pole around longitude 140°. A deeply wounded Captain Jacquinot urged the hiring of a number of replacements (generally deserters from a French whaler anchored in Hobart) and convinced him to reconsider his intentions; Astrolabe and Zelée both left Hobart on 1 January 1840. Dumont's plan was very simple: to head south, wind conditions permitting.

==== Turning south ====
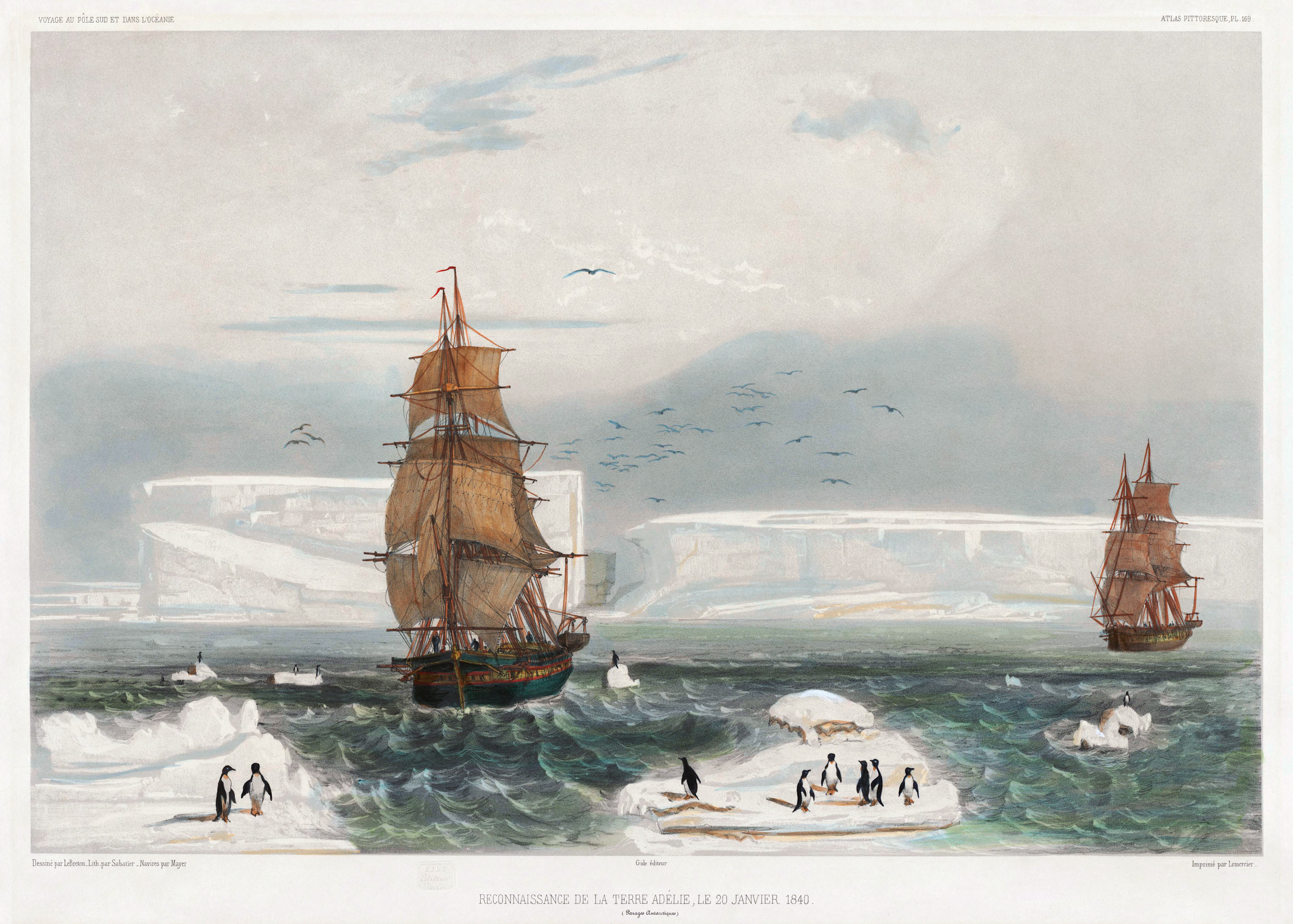
Reconnaissance de la Terre Adelie, 20 Janvier 1840 ("Reconnaissance of Adelie Land, 20 January 1840")

The first days of the voyage mainly involved the crossing of twenty degrees and a westerly current; on board there were further misfortunes, including the loss of a man. Crossing the 50°S parallel, they experienced unexpected falls in the air and water temperatures. After completing the crossing of the Antarctic Convergence, on 16 January 1840, at 60°S they sighted the first iceberg and two days later the ships found themselves in the middle of a mass of ice. On 20 January (Note: Instead of 19 January 1840, since Dumont d'Urville forgot to add one day on his diary when he passed the 180° meridian from the east "Proposition de classement du rocher du débarquement dans le cadre des sites et monuments historiques". Antarctic Treaty Consultative meeting. 2006. note 4. Archived from the original on 11 August 2013.) the expedition crossed the Antarctic Circle, with celebrations similar to crossing of the Equator ceremonies, and they sighted land the same afternoon.

The two ships slowly sailed to the West, skirting walls of ice, and on 22 January, (Note: Instead of 21 January 1840, since Dumont d'Urville forgot to add one day on his diary when he passed the 180° meridian from the east, (in French) Proposition de classement du rocher du débarquement dans le cadre des sites et monuments historiques, Antarctic Treaty Consultative meeting 2006, note 4) just before 9 in the evening, some members of the crew disembarked on the north-westernmost and highest islet of the rocky group of Dumoulin Islands, at 500–600 m from the icy coast of the Astrolabe Glacier Tongue of the time, today about 4 km north from the glacier extremity near Cape Géodésie, and hoisted the French tricolour. (Note: "J'envoyai aussitôt un de nos matelots déployer un drapeau sur ces terres qu'aucune créature humaine n'avait ni vues ni foulées avant nous". (I sent one of our sailors at once to deploy a flag on these lands which no human creature had seen nor trod before us) — from the Diary of Joseph Dubouzet, an officer on the Zélée).) Dumont named the archipelago Pointe Géologie and the land beyond, Terre Adélie (Note: Alors, j'annonçais aux officiers rassemblés en présence de l'équipage que cette terre porterait désormais le nom de terre Adélie. Cette désignation est destinée à perpétuer le souvenir de ma profonde reconnaissance pour la compagne dévouée qui a su par trois fois consentir à une séparation longue et douloureuse, pour me permettre d'accomplir mes projets d'explorations lointaines. (Then, I announced to the officers gathered in the presence of the crew that this land would carry from now on the name of Terre Adélie. This name is intended to perpetuate the memory of my deep recognition for my devoted partner who agreed three times to long and painful separations, to enable me to carry out my plans for remote explorations.)) The map of the coast drawn under sail by the hydrographer Clément Adrien Vincendon-Dumoulin is remarkably accurate given the means of the time.

In the following days the expedition followed the coast westward then led for the first time some experiments to determine the approximate position of the South magnetic pole. They sighted the American schooner Porpoise of the United States Exploring Expedition commanded by Charles Wilkes on 30 January 1840, but failed to communicate due to a misunderstanding. On 1 February, Dumont decided to turn to the north heading for Hobart, which the two ships reached 17 days later. They were present for the arrival of the two ships of James Ross's expedition to Antarctica, HMS Terror and HMS Erebus.

On 25 February, the schooners sailed towards the Auckland Islands, where they carried out magnetic measurements and they left a commemorative plate of their visit (as had the commander of Porpoise previously), in which they announced the discovery of the South Magnetic Pole. (Note: The plate stated, among other things: “"Du 19 Janvier au 1 Février, 1840, découverte de la Terre Adélie et détermination du pole magnétique Austral!” (From 19 January to 1 February 1840, discovered Adélie Land and determined the position of the Southern Magnetic Pole!”) They returned via New Zealand, the Torres Strait, Timor, Réunion, Saint Helena and finally Toulon, returning on 6 November 1840, the last French expedition of exploration to sail.

==== Return to France ====
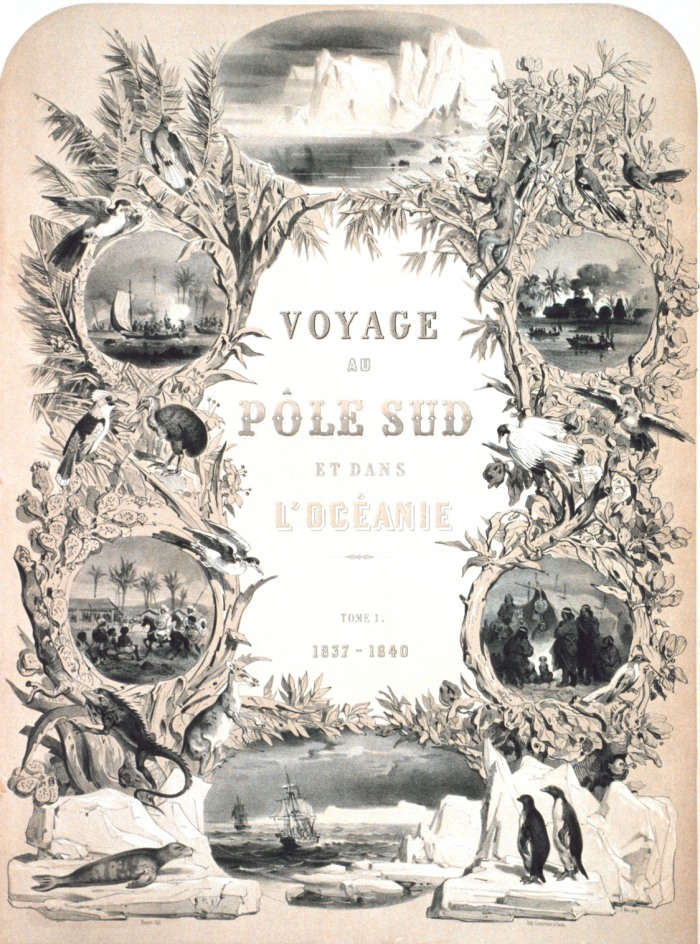
Frontispiece to: Voyage au pole sud et dans l'Oceanie

On his return Dumont d'Urville was promoted to rear admiral and was awarded the Gold Medal of the Société de Géographie (Geographical Society of Paris), later becoming its president. He then took over the writing of the report of the expedition, Voyage au pôle Sud et dans l'Océanie sur les corvettes l'Astrolabe et la Zélée 1837–1840, which was published between 1841 and 1854 in 24 volumes, plus seven more volumes with illustrations and maps.

== Death and legacy ==
On 8 May 1842, Dumont and his family boarded a train from Versailles to Paris after seeing water games celebrating the king. Near Meudon the train's locomotive derailed, the wagons rolled and the tender's coal ended up on the front of the train and caught fire. Dumont's whole family died in the flames of the first French railway disaster, generally known as the Versailles rail accident. Dumont's remains were identified by Pierre-Marie Alexandre Dumoutier, a doctor on board the Astrolabe and a phrenologist.

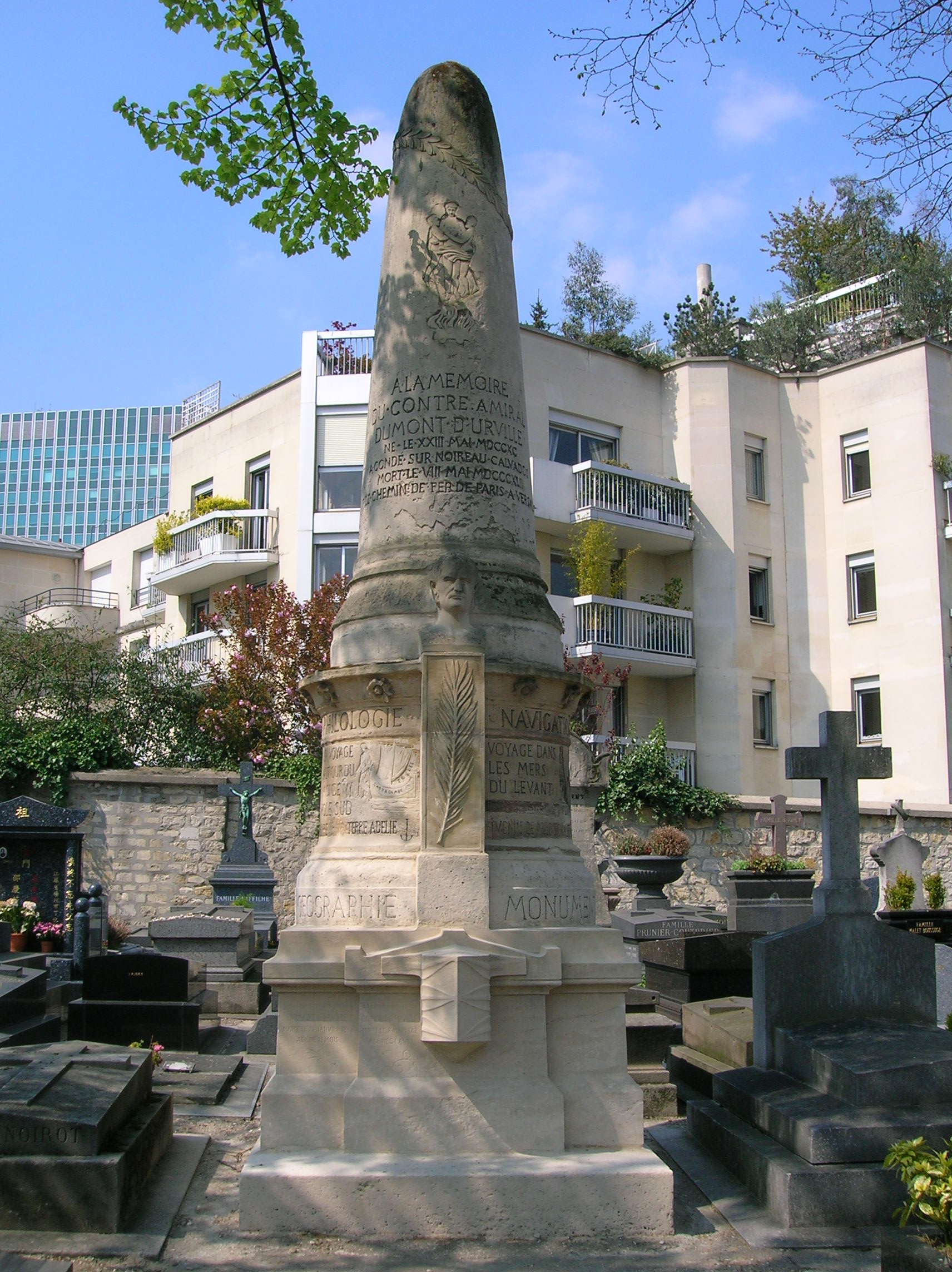
Dumont-d'Urville's tombstone in Paris

Dumont was buried in the Montparnasse Cemetery in Paris. This tragedy led to the end of the practice in France of locking passengers in their train compartments.

He is the author of The New Zealanders: A story of Austral lands – likely to be the first novel written about fictional Maori characters. Later, in honour of his many valuable chartings, the D'Urville Sea off Antarctica; D'Urville Island in the Joinville Island group in Antarctica; D'Urville Wall on the David Glacier in Antarctica; Cape d'Urville, Irian Jaya, Indonesia; Mount D'Urville, Auckland Island; and D'Urville Island in New Zealand were named after him. The Dumont d'Urville Station on Antarctica is also named after him, as is the Rue Dumont d'Urville, a street near the Champs-Élysées in the 8th arrondissement of Paris, and the Lycée Dumont D'Urville in Caen.

Dumont d'Urville himself named Pepin Island in New Zealand and Adélie Land in Antarctica after his wife, and Croisilles Harbour for his mother's family. (Note: Some sources state that d'Urville also named Adele Island but this is incorrect (see Talk:Jules Dumont d'Urville).)

A French naval transport ship employed in French Polynesia is named after him; as was a 1931 sloop which served in World War II.

== Sources and references ==
=== References ===
- Dunmore, John (2007). The Life of Dumont d'Urville: From Venus to Antarctica. Auckland, New Zealand: Exisle Publishing. ISBN 978-0-908988-71-6.
- Edward Duyker Dumont d’Urville: Explorer and Polymath, Otago University Press, Dunedin, 2014, pp. 671, ISBN 978 1 877578 70 0, University of Hawai’i Press, Honolulu, 2014, ISBN 9780824851392.
- Guillon, Jacques (1986). Dumont d'Urville (in French). Paris: France-Empire.
- Gurney, Alan (2000). The race to the white continent. New York: W.W. Norton & Company. pp. 320. ISBN 0-393-05004-1.
- Lesson, René-Primevère Alan (1845). Notice historique sur l'amiral Dumont d'Urville (in French). Rochefort: Imprimerie de Henry Loustau.
- Taillemite, Étienne (2008). Les hommes qui ont fait la marine française. Paris: Perrin. ISBN 978-2-262-02222-8.
- Vergniol, Camille (1930). Dumont d'Urville. La grande légende de la mer (in French).
