= Adriano Balbi =

Italian geographer

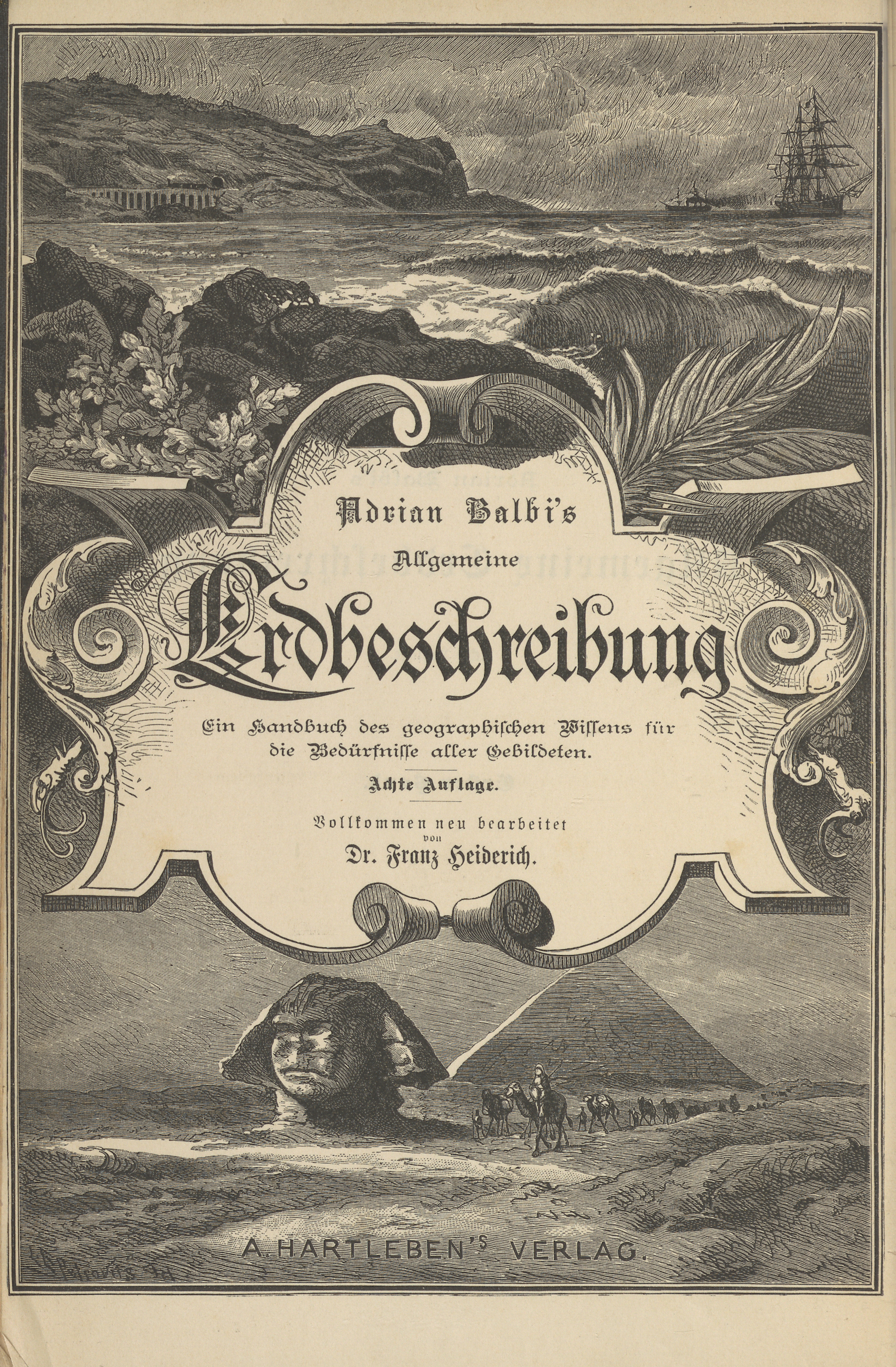
- German edition of Balbi's Compendio di geografia, 1893
- Born: 25 April 1782; Venice, Republic of Venice
- Died: 14 March 1848 (aged 65); Venice, Kingdom of Lombardy–Venetia
- Occupation: Geographer
- Scientific career
- Fields: Geography; Statistics

Adriano Balbi (April 25, 1782 – March 14, 1848) was an Italian geographer.

== Biography ==
Adriano Balbi was born in Venice on 25 April 1782. The publication of his Prospetto politico-geografico dello stato attuale del globo (Venice, 1808) obtained his election to the chair of professor of geography at the college of San Michele at Murano; in 1811–1813 he was professor of physics at the Lyceum of Fermo, and afterwards became attached to the customs office at his native city.

In 1820 he visited Portugal, and there collected materials for his Essai statistique sur le royaume de Portugal et d’Algarve, published in 1822 at Paris, where the author resided from 1821 until 1832. This was followed by Variétés politiques et statistiques de la monarchie portugaise, which contains some observations respecting that country under the Roman sway. In 1826 he published the first volume of his Atlas ethnographique du globe, ou classification des peuples anciens et modernes d’après leurs langues, a work of great erudition. In 1829 he published, with Andre-Michel Guerry, Statistique comparée de l'état de l'instruction et du nombre des crimes dans les divers arrondissements des Académies et des Cours Royales de France, the first comparative choropleth map showing crime in relation to level of instruction.

In 1832 appeared the Abrégé de Geographie, which, in an enlarged form, was translated. into the principal languages of Europe. Balbi retired to Padua and there died in 1848.

His son, Eugenio Balbi (1812–1884), followed a similar career, being professor of geography at Pavia, and publishing his father's Scritti Geografici (Turin, 1841), and original works in Gea, ossia la terra (Trieste, 1854–1867) and Saggio di geografia (Milan, 1868).
