= Talutis Inlet =

Coordinates: 77°15′S 81°30′W

Talutis Inlet is an ice-filled inlet in the western side of Fowler Ice Rise. The inlet opens onto Carlson Inlet just south of Kealey Ice Rise. Mapped by United States Geological Survey (USGS) from imagery provided by NASA Earth Resources Technology Satellite (ERTS-1), 1973–74. Named by Advisory Committee on Antarctic Names (US-ACAN) for Lieutenant William R. Talutis, U.S. Navy, Officer-in-Charge of the South Pole Station, 1972.
