= Kealey =

Kealey is a surname. Notable people with the surname include:

- Ben Kealey, the English touring keyboardist for the rock band Kasabian
- Gregory Kealey (born 1948), professor, historian, editor, provost
- Mitchell Kealey (born 1984), Australian middle-distance runner
- Steve Kealey (born 1947), former Major League Baseball pitcher
- Terence Kealey (born 1952), British biochemist, Vice-Chancellor of the University of Buckingham
- Tom Kealey, American writer

== See also ==
- Kealey Ice Rise, an ice rise, 70 km long and 30 km wide, forming a western lobe of the larger Fowler Ice Rise
