= Kealey Ice Rise =

Coordinates: 77°S 83°W

Kealey Ice Rise is an ice rise, 40 nautical miles (70 km) long and 15 nautical miles (30 km) wide, forming a western lobe of the larger Fowler Ice Rise. It is situated just north of the junction of Talutis Inlet and Carlson Inlet, at the southwest side of the Ronne Ice Shelf. It was mapped by the United States Geological Survey from imagery provided by the NASA Earth Resources Technology Satellite (ERTS-1), 1973–74, and was named by the Advisory Committee on Antarctic Names for Lieutenant Gerald P. Kealey, U.S. Navy, medical officer at South Pole Station in 1971.
