= Haag Nunataks =

Nunatak group in Palmer Land, Antarctica

The Haag Nunataks (77°0′S 78°18′W) in Antarctica are a group of three, low, nearly north-south alighed knolls, known as nunataks. All three nunataks contain small, less than 2 km^{2} (0.77 mi^{2}) in total area, outcrops of granitic bedrock. The bedrock outcrops that occur in the Haag Nunataks are the only known exposures of Precambrian rocks in West Antarctica.

These nunataks have been mapped in the past as Monte Haag, Mount Haag, and Mount Joseph Haag. The Ronne Antarctic Research Expedition (1947–48), led by Finn Ronne, discovered these nunataks. Initially, Finn Ronne named them Mount Haag for Joseph Haag, head of Todd Shipyards, New York City, built the expedition's ship. Mount Haag was amended by Advisory Committee on Antarctic Names (US-ACAN) to Haag Nunataks because aerial photographs obtained by U.S. Navy Squadron VX-6 in 1966 show the feature to be a group of nunataks, not a mountain,

The Haag Nunataks are part of a very large ice rise, known as the Fowler Ice Rise, that lies between Evans Ice Stream and Carlson Inlet, in the southwest part of Ronne Ice Shelf. The Fowler Ice Rise is completely ice covered except for the Haag Nunataks. Fowler Ridge was named by US-ACAN for Capt. Alfred N. Fowler, USN (Ret.), Commander, U.S. Naval Support Force, Antarctica, 1972-74.

== Geology ==
The granitic basement rocks exposed in the Haag Nunataks consist of highly deformed and foliated granodioritic and dioritic orthogneisses. These orthogneisses were initially intruded by aplite and pegmatite dikes and later intruded by magmatic granite dikes. The main tectonic, planar, fabric of the orthogneiss trends north–south. This planar fabric has been deformed by a second and final deformation event evident as shear zones and fold hinges that effect the planar fabric of the orthogneisses. The shear zones and fold hinges of the second deformation event has also deformed the aplite and pegmatite dikes. The geochemical and isotopic data for the orthogneisses are consistent with their protoliths being igneous rocks associated with either a continental margin or island arc crustal setting.

Whole-rock rubidium–strontium dating of the basement rocks of Haag Nunataks yielded imprecise ages of 1176 ± 76 Ma for the orthogneisses, 1058 ± 53 Ma for the aplite dikes, and 1003 ± 18 Ma for the granite dikes. These dates establish the age of crustal formation as occurring between 1000 and 1100 Ma and these rocks having formed during the Mesoproterozoic Grenville orogeny. K-Ar age determinations of biotite and hornblende range from 1031 to 991 Ma indicating a lack of any significant tectono-thermal alteration of either the orthogneisses or the intrusive dikes since the Late Mesoproterozoic.

The interpretation of aeromagnetic data by Garrett and others indicates that the granitic basement rocks exposed in the Haag Nunataks underlie an area at least 350 by 350 km (220 by 220 mi). The area includes Coats Land, Whitmore Mountains, and the Ellsworth Mountains. These basement rocks exhibit high amplitude magnetic anomalies matching those at Haag Nunataks.

== Fauna and flora ==
In association with detailed biological field surveys of sites in Ellsworth Land by P. Convey, the more isolated Haag Nunataks were visited on February 23, 2001. During this visit and later examination of samples collected during it, the Haag Nunataks were found to be devoid of any fauna and flora, including tardigrades.
