= Douglas C-47 Skytrain =

Military transport aircraft derived from DC-3

C-47 Skytrain / Dakota C-53 Skytrooper
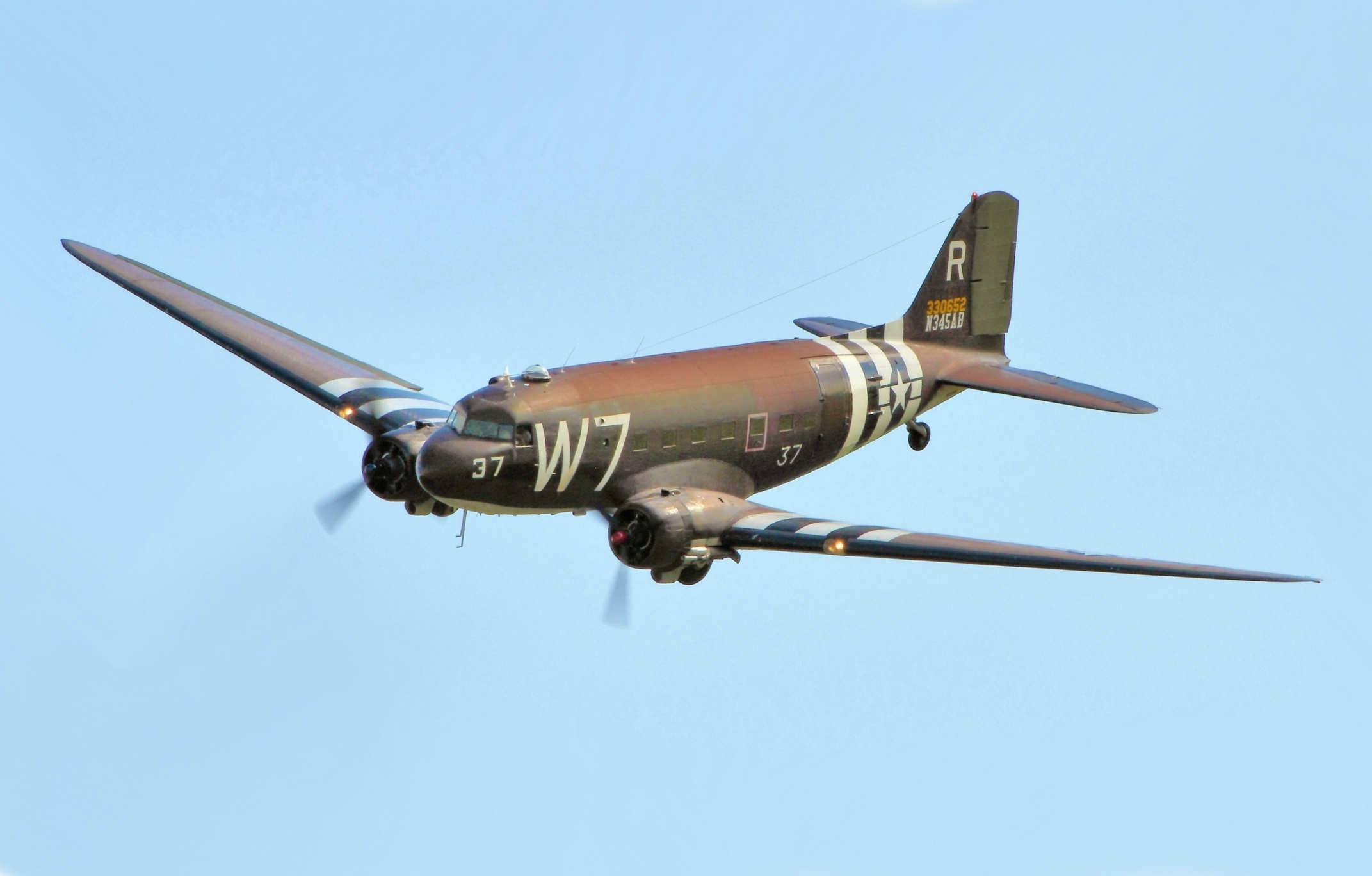
- C-47 43-30652 "Whiskey 7" at 2014 Duxford D-Day Show

General information
- Type: Military transport aircraft
- National origin: United States
- Manufacturer: Douglas Aircraft Company
- Status: In service
- Primary users: United States Army Air Forces Royal Air Force; United States Navy; Royal Canadian Air Force; See operators
- Number built: 10,174

History
- First flight: 23 December 1941
- Developed from: Douglas DC-3
- Variants: Douglas XCG-17; Douglas AC-47 Spooky; Douglas R4D-8

The Douglas C-47 Skytrain, or Dakota (RAF designation), is a military transport aircraft that was developed from the civilian Douglas DC-3 airliner. It was used extensively by the Allies during World War II. During the war, the C-47 was used for troop transport, cargo, paratrooper drops, glider towing, and military cargo parachute drops. The C-47 remained in front-line service with various military operators for many years. It was produced in roughly triple the numbers of the larger, much heavier-payload Curtiss C-46 Commando, which filled a similar role for the U.S. military.

About 100 countries' armed forces have operated the C-47, with over 60 variants of the aircraft produced. As with the civilian DC-3, the C-47 remains in service, over 80 years after the type's introduction.

== Design and development ==
The C-47 differed from the civilian DC-3 by numerous modifications, including being fitted with a cargo door, hoist attachment with a strengthened floor, a shortened tail cone for glider-towing shackles, and an astrodome in the cabin roof.

During World War II, the armed forces of many countries used the C-47 and modified DC-3s for the transport of troops, cargo, and wounded. The U.S. Navy's designation was R4D. More than 10,000 aircraft were produced in Long Beach and Santa Monica, California, and Oklahoma City, Oklahoma. Between March 1943 and August 1945, the Oklahoma City plant produced 5,354 C-47s.

The specialized C-53 Skytrooper troop transport started production in October 1941 at Douglas Aircraft's Santa Monica plant. It lacked the cargo door, hoist attachment, and reinforced floor of the C-47. Only 380 aircraft were produced because the C-47 was found to be more versatile.

=== Super DC-3 (R4D-8) ===
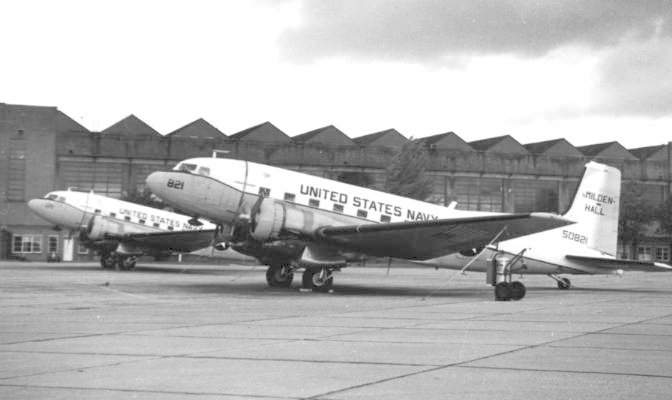
U.S. Navy C-117Ds at RAF Mildenhall in 1967

Large numbers of DC-3s and surplus C-47s were in commercial use in the United States in the 1940s. In response to proposed changes to the Civil Air Regulations (CAR) airworthiness requirements that would limit the continuing use of these aircraft, Douglas offered a late-1940s DC-3 conversion to improve takeoff and single-engine performance. This new model, the DC-3S or "Super DC-3", was 39 in (99 cm) longer. It allowed 38 passengers to be carried, with increased speed to compete with newer airliners. The rearward shift in the center of gravity led to larger tail surfaces and new, swept-back outer wings. More powerful engines were installed along with shorter, jet ejection-type exhaust stacks. These were either 1,475 hp (1,100 kW; 1,495 PS) Wright R-1820 Cyclones or 1,450 hp (1,080 kW; 1,470 PS) Pratt & Whitney R-2000 Twin Wasps in larger engine nacelles. Minor changes included wheelwell doors, a partially retractable tailwheel, flush rivets, and low-drag antenna. These all contributed to an increased top speed of 250 mph (400 km/h; 220 kn). With over 75% of the original DC-3/C-47 configuration changed, the modified design was virtually a new aircraft. The first DC-3S made its maiden flight on 23 June 1949.

The changes fully met the new CAR 4B airworthiness requirements, with significantly improved performance. However, little interest in the DC-3S was expressed by commercial operators. It was too expensive for the smaller operators that were its main target; only three were sold, to Capital Airlines. The U.S. Navy and U.S. Marine Corps had 100 R4Ds modified to Super DC-3 standard as the R4D-8.

== Operational history ==
=== World War II ===
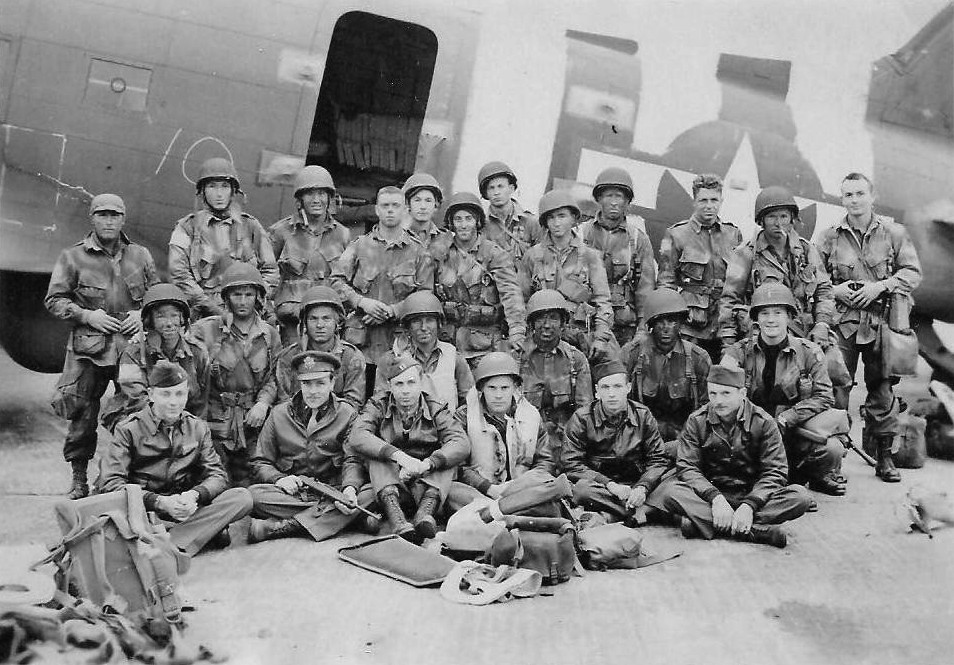
U.S. Army Pathfinders and USAAF flight crew prior to D-Day, June 1944, in front of a C-47 Skytrain at RAF North Witham

The C-47 was vital to the success of many Allied campaigns, in particular, those at Guadalcanal and in the jungles of New Guinea and Burma, where the C-47 and its naval version, the R4D, made countering the mobility of the light-traveling Japanese Army possible for Allied troops. C-47s were used to airlift supplies to the encircled American forces during the Battle of Bastogne in Belgium. Possibly its most influential role in military aviation, however, was flying "the Hump" from India into China. The expertise gained flying "the Hump" was later used in the Berlin Airlift, in which the C-47 played a major role until the aircraft were replaced by Douglas C-54 Skymasters.

In Europe, the C-47 and a specialized paratroop variant, the C-53 Skytrooper, were used in vast numbers in the later stages of the war, particularly to tow gliders and drop paratroops. During the invasion of Sicily in July 1943, C-47s dropped 4,381 Allied paratroops. More than 50,000 paratroops were dropped by C-47s during the first few days of the D-Day campaign also known as the invasion of Normandy, France, in June 1944. In the Pacific War, with careful use of the island landing strips of the Pacific Ocean, C-47s were used to return soldiers serving in the Pacific theater to the United States.

About 2,000 C-47s (received under Lend-Lease) in British and Commonwealth service took the name "Dakota", possibly inspired by the acronym "DACoTA" for Douglas Aircraft Company Transport Aircraft.

The C-47 also earned the informal nickname "gooney bird" in the European theatre of operations. Other sources attribute this name to the first aircraft, a USMC R2D—the military version of the DC-2—being the first aircraft to land on Midway Island, previously home to the long-winged albatross, known as the gooney bird, which was native to Midway.

=== Postwar era ===
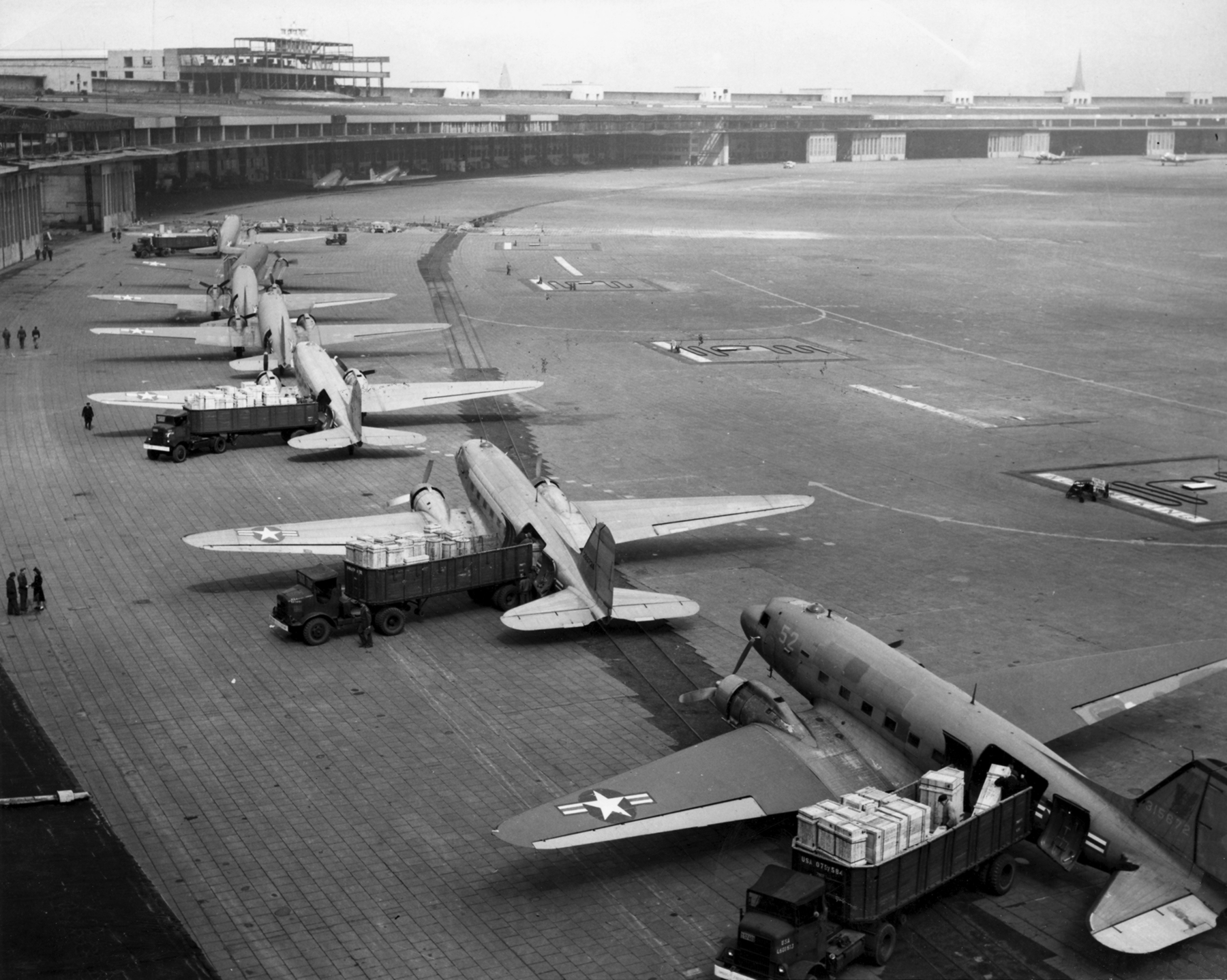
C-47s unloading at Tempelhof Airport during the Berlin Airlift, 1948

The United States Air Force's (USAF) Strategic Air Command had Skytrains in service from 1946 to 1967. Its 6th Special Operations Squadron was flying the C-47 until 2008.

With all of their aircraft and pilots having been part of the Royal Indian Air Force prior to independence, both the Indian Air Force and Pakistan Air Force used C-47s to transport supplies to their soldiers fighting in the Indo-Pakistan War of 1947. The IAF commenced its airlift of troops and supplies to Srinagar and Poonch on 27 October 1947, bringing elements of the Indian Army for deployment to forward areas.

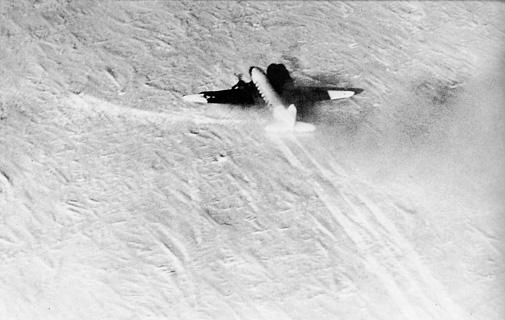
A U.S. Navy R4D-5L was the first aircraft to land at the South Pole, 31 October 1956 for Operation Deep Freeze II

After World War II, thousands of surplus C-47s were converted to civilian airline use, some remaining in operation in 2012, as well as being used as private aircraft.

In October 1956, a U.S. Navy R4D-5L named Que Sera Sera landed at the South Pole in Antarctica. This was the first time humans had been at the pole since 1912 (see Robert F. Scott's British Antarctic Expedition).

=== Vietnam War ===
Several C-47 variants were used in the Vietnam War by the USAF, including three advanced electronic-warfare variations, which sometimes were called "electric gooneys" designated EC-47N, EC-47P, or EC-47Q depending on the engine used. In addition, HC-47s were used by the 9th Special Operations Squadron to conduct psychological warfare operations over South Vietnam and Laos. Miami Air International, Miami International Airport was a USAF military depot used to convert the commercial DC-3s/C-47s into military use. They came in as commercial aircraft purchased from third-world airlines and were completely stripped, rebuilt, and reconditioned. Long-range fuel tanks were installed, along with upgraded avionics and gun mounts. They left as first-rate military aircraft headed for combat in Vietnam in a variety of missions. (Note: Air International out of Miami International Airport was a military depot used by the USAF to convert the DC-3s into military use.) EC-47s were also operated by the Vietnamese, Laotian, and Cambodian Air Forces. A gunship variation, using three 7.62 mm miniguns, designated AC-47 "Spooky", often nicknamed "Puff the Magic Dragon", also was deployed.

=== USAF retirement ===
In June 1975, the USAF retired the last C-47 in service. In the U.S. Navy (USN) and Marine Corps (USMC), the McDonnell Douglas DC-9 airliner in USN service was named the C-9B Skytrain II in honor of the C-47 Skytrain.

The USMC operated two C-47s in the United States at MCAS Yuma until at least 1978 and two in Japan at MCAS Iwakuni until at least 1980.

== Variants ==
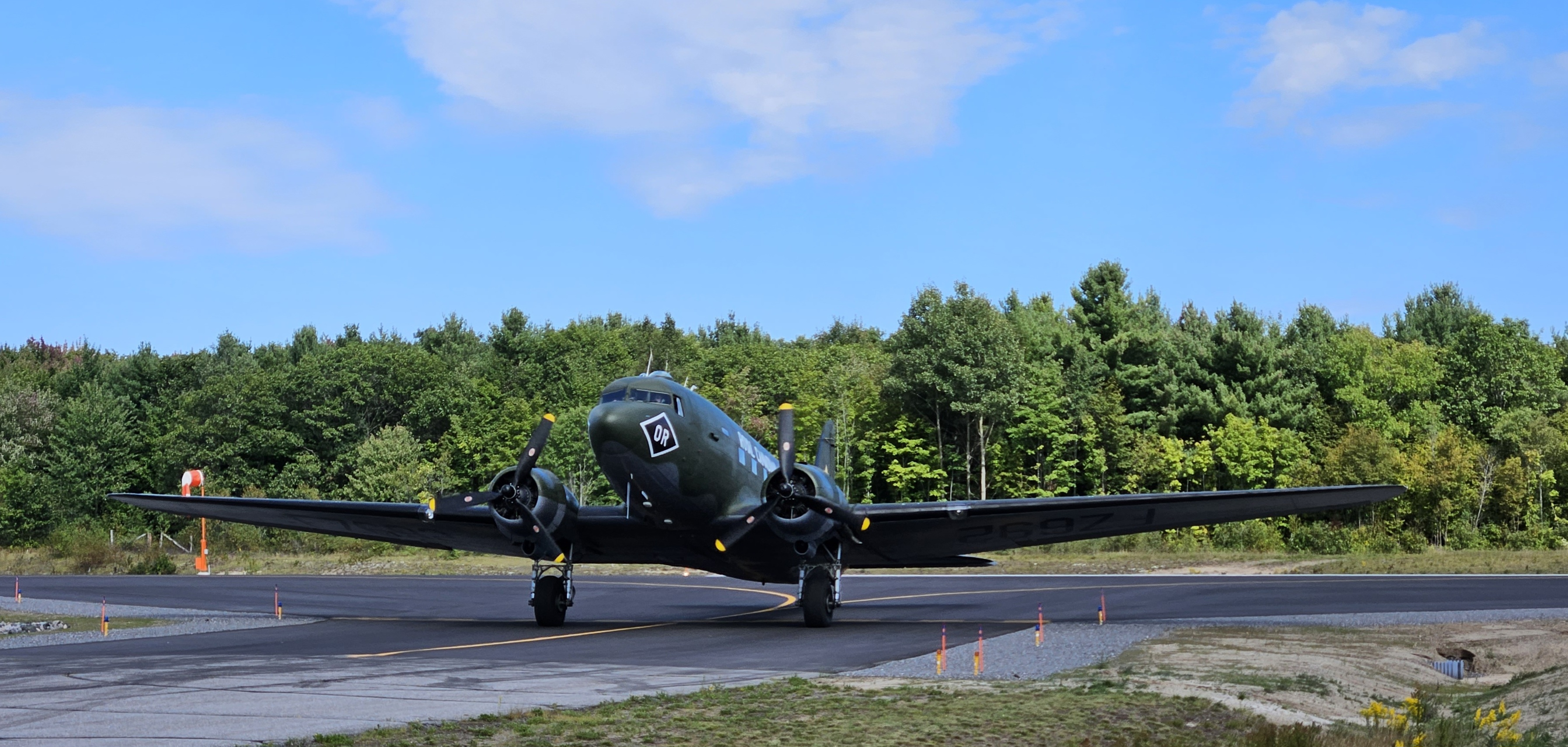
C-47 in RCAF livery, still flying today, operated by the RAF in England during WWII, FZ692 participated in two major airborne operations: Normandy and the Rhine Crossing.

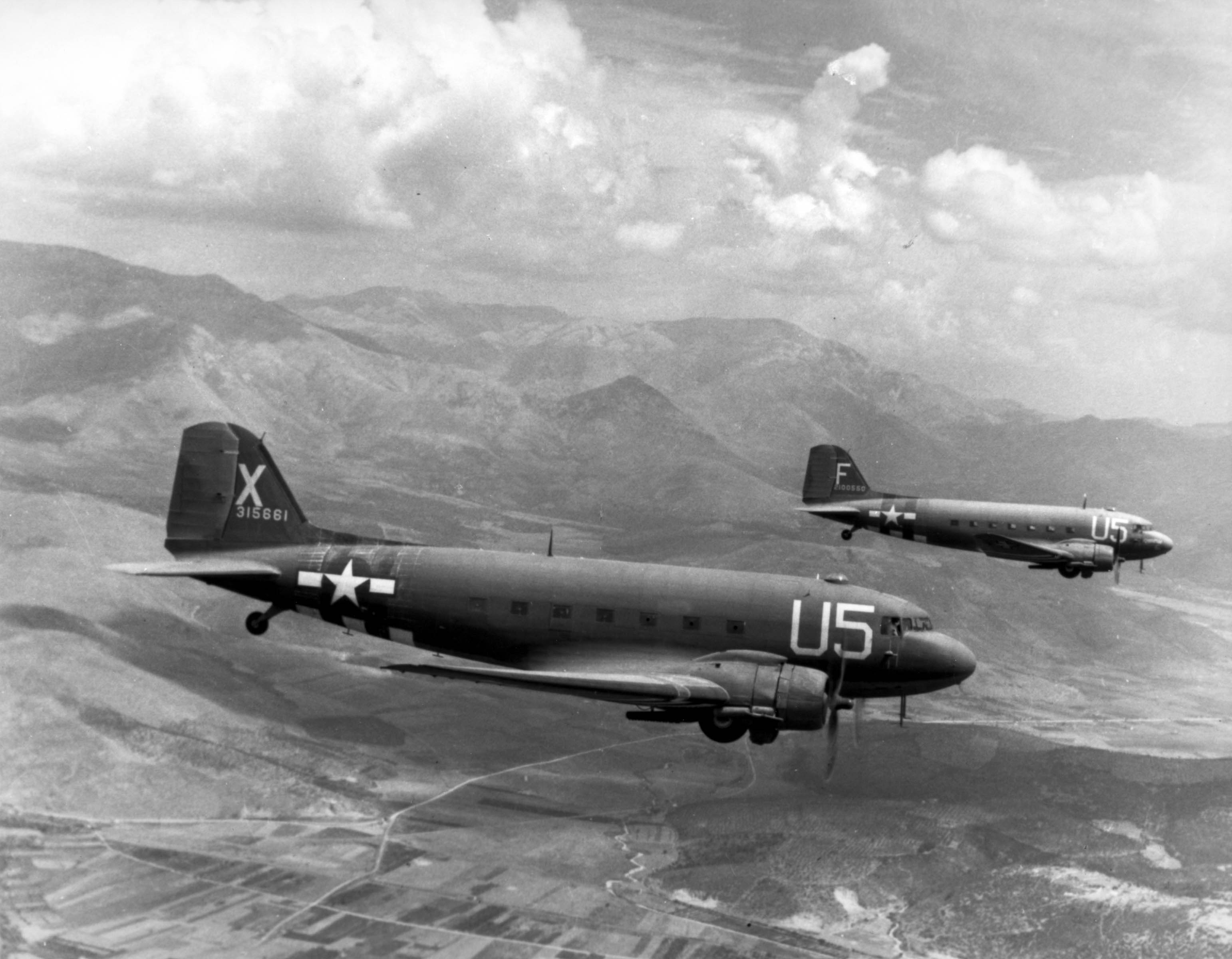
Paratroop C-47, 12th Air Force Troop Carrier Wing, invasion of southern France, 15 August 1944

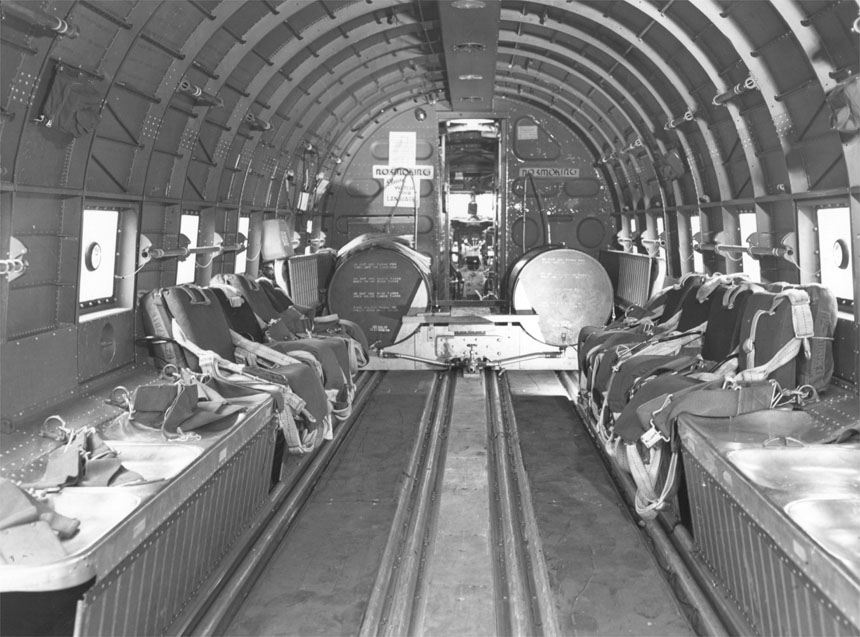
Interior view of Douglas C-47, Hendon Aerodrome, England

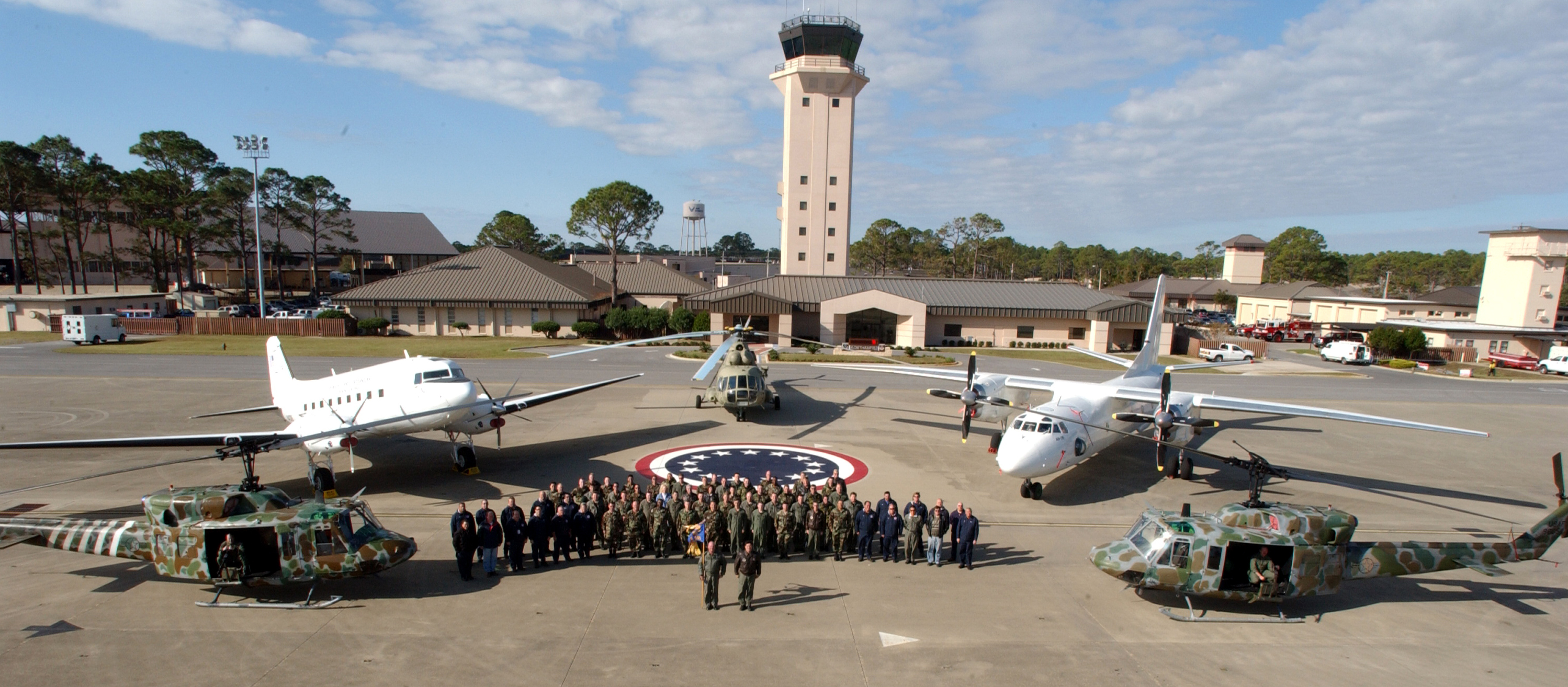
Aircraft of the 6th Special Operations Squadron including a turboprop C-47 (Basler BT-67) in use by the USAF, c. 2005

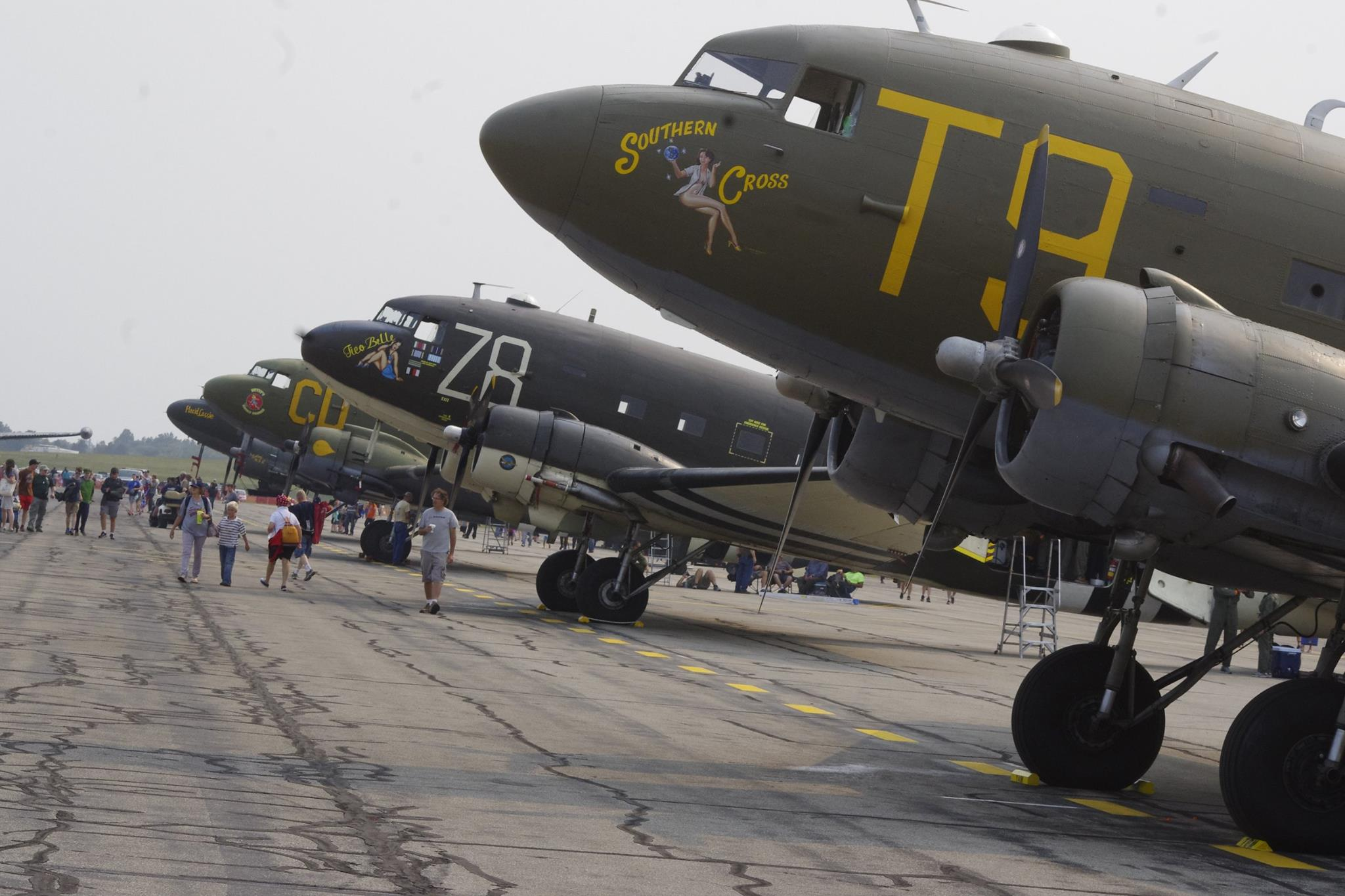
Douglas C-47 lineup at Willow Run, Michigan Airshow, August 2017

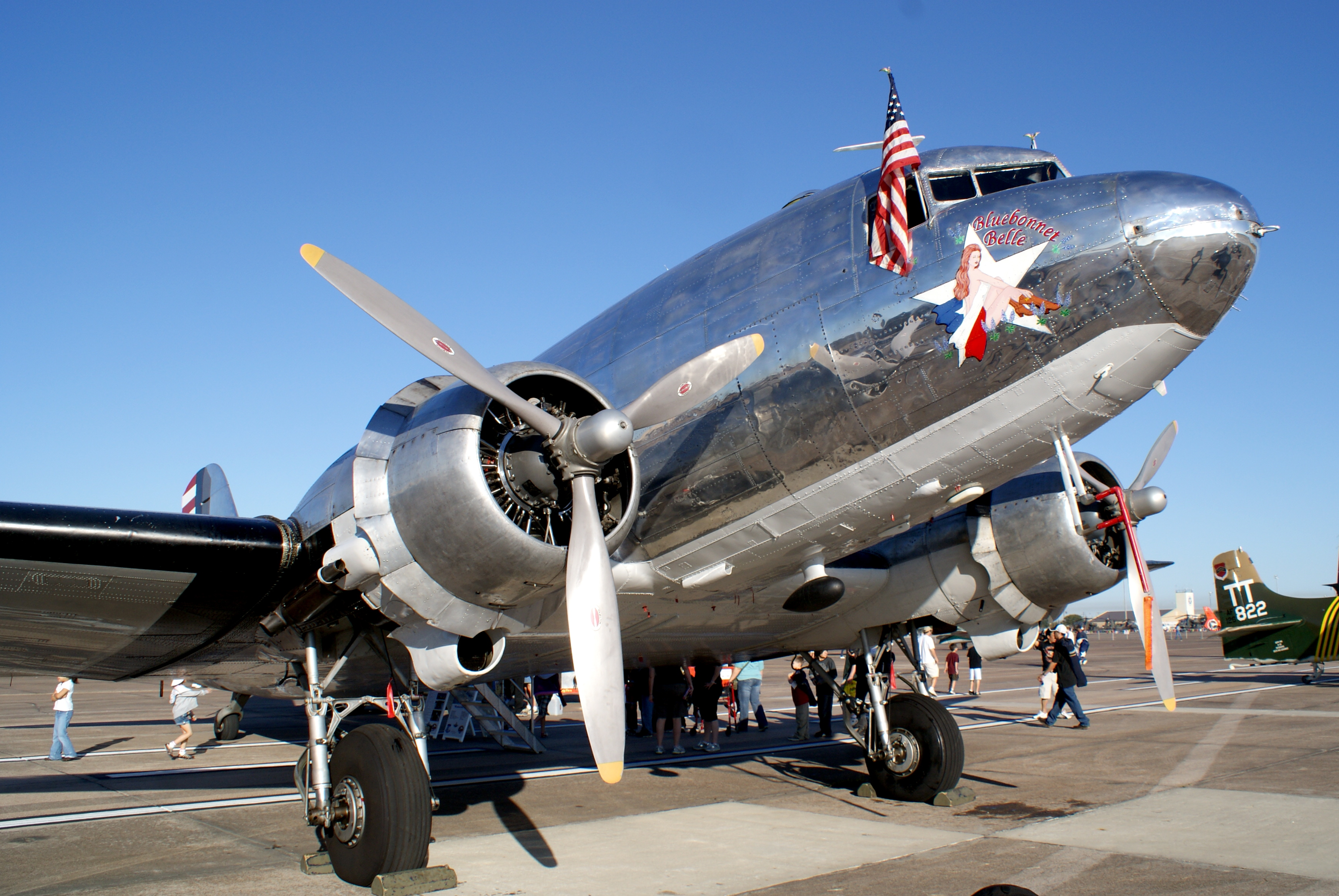
C-47B Skytrain 43-49942

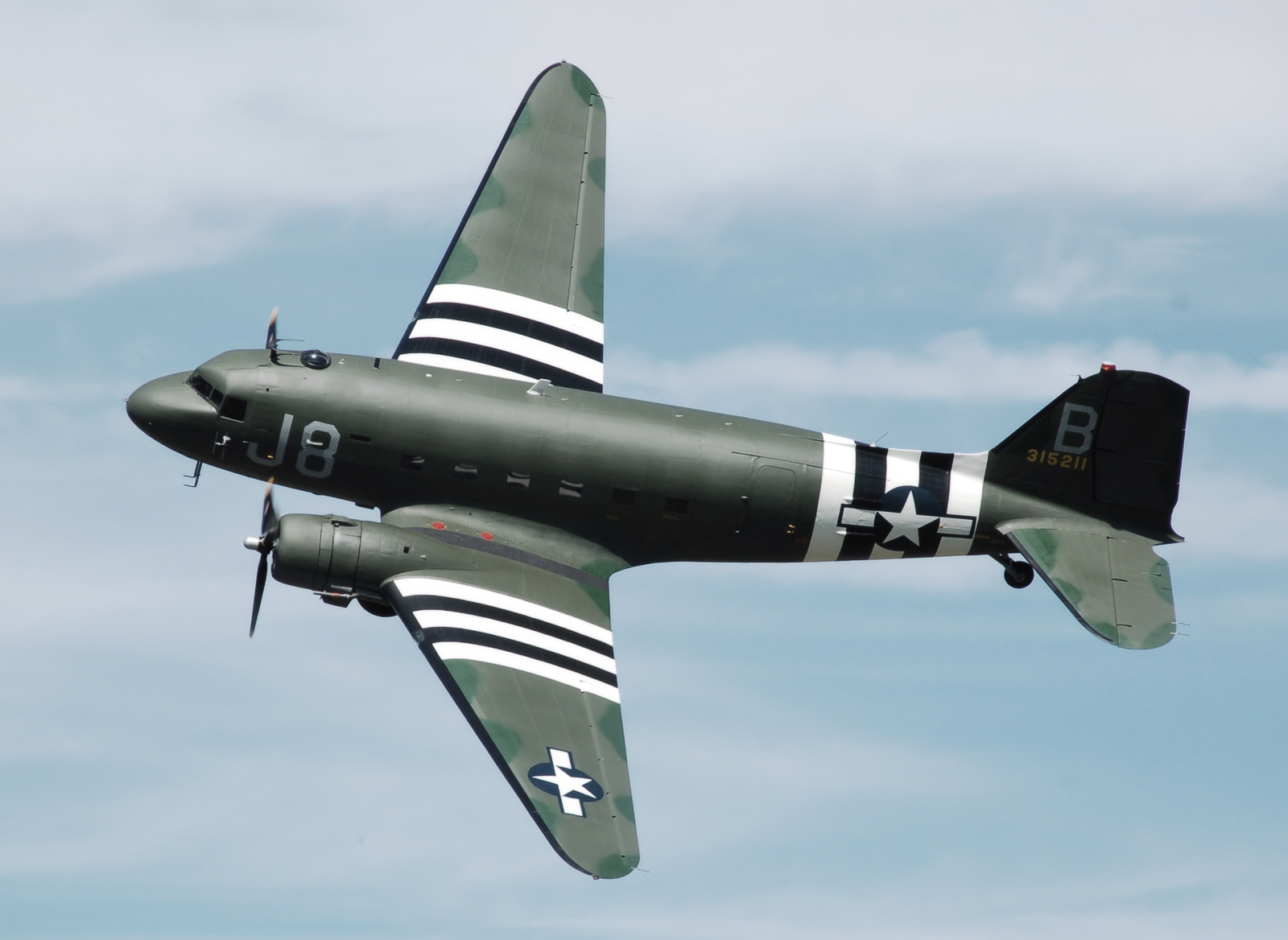
A former USAAF C-47A Skytrain which flew from a base in Devon, England, during the D-Day Normandy invasion and shows "invasion stripes" on her wings and fuselage

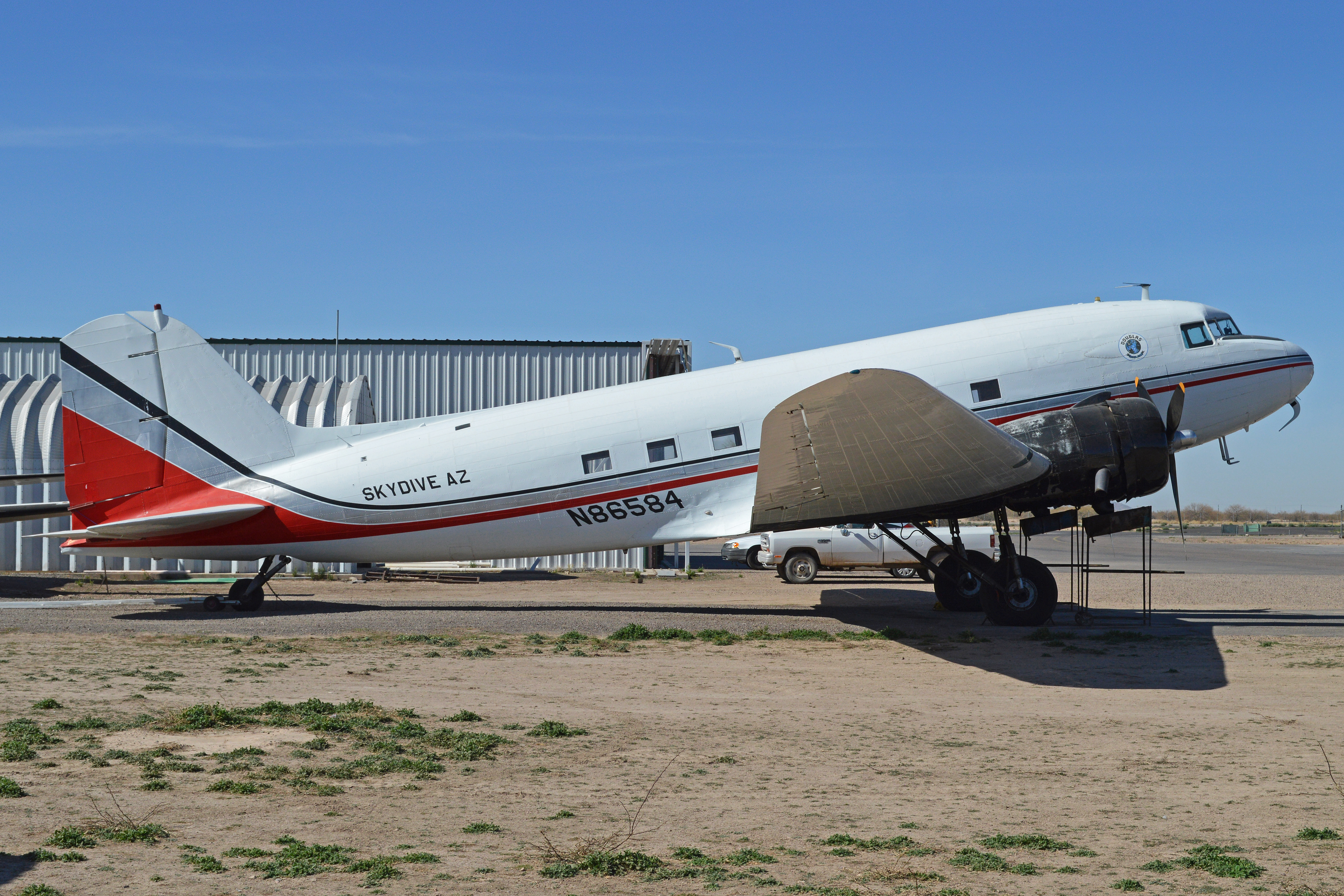
Douglas C-53 Skytrooper, c/n 4935, operated by a skydiving service at Eloy, Arizona

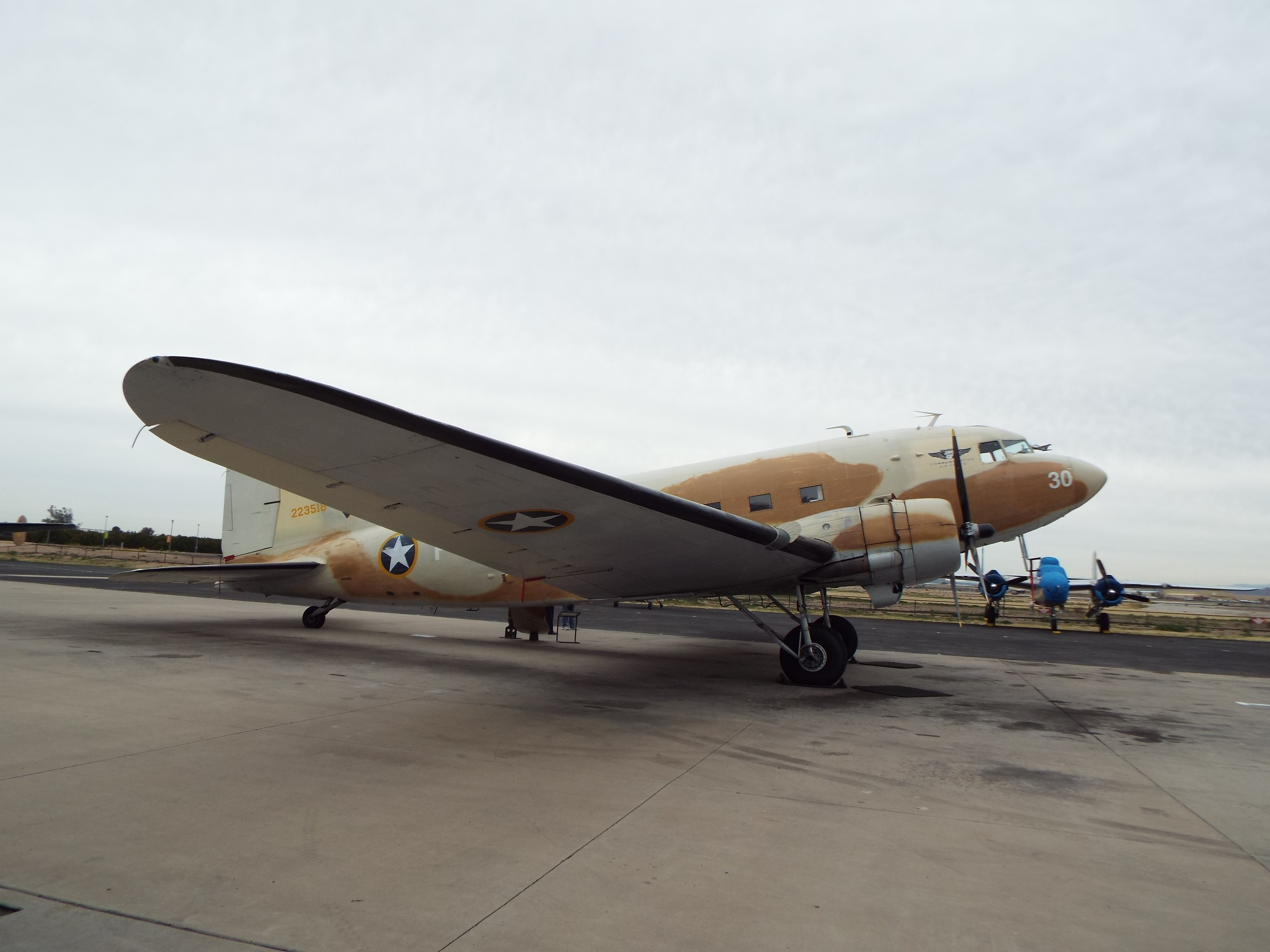
Douglas C-47A Skytrain Old Number 30

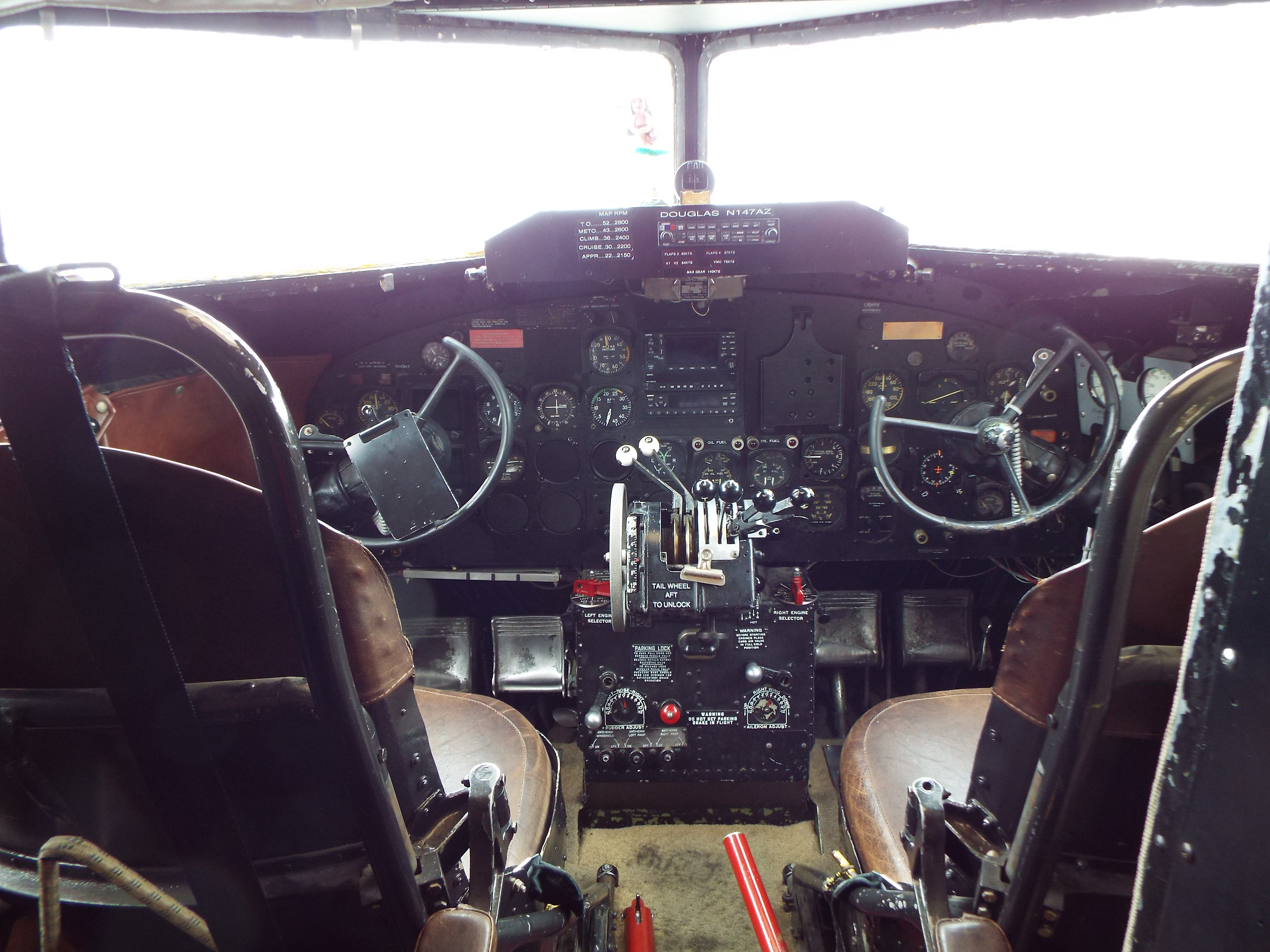
C-47 Skytrain cockpit

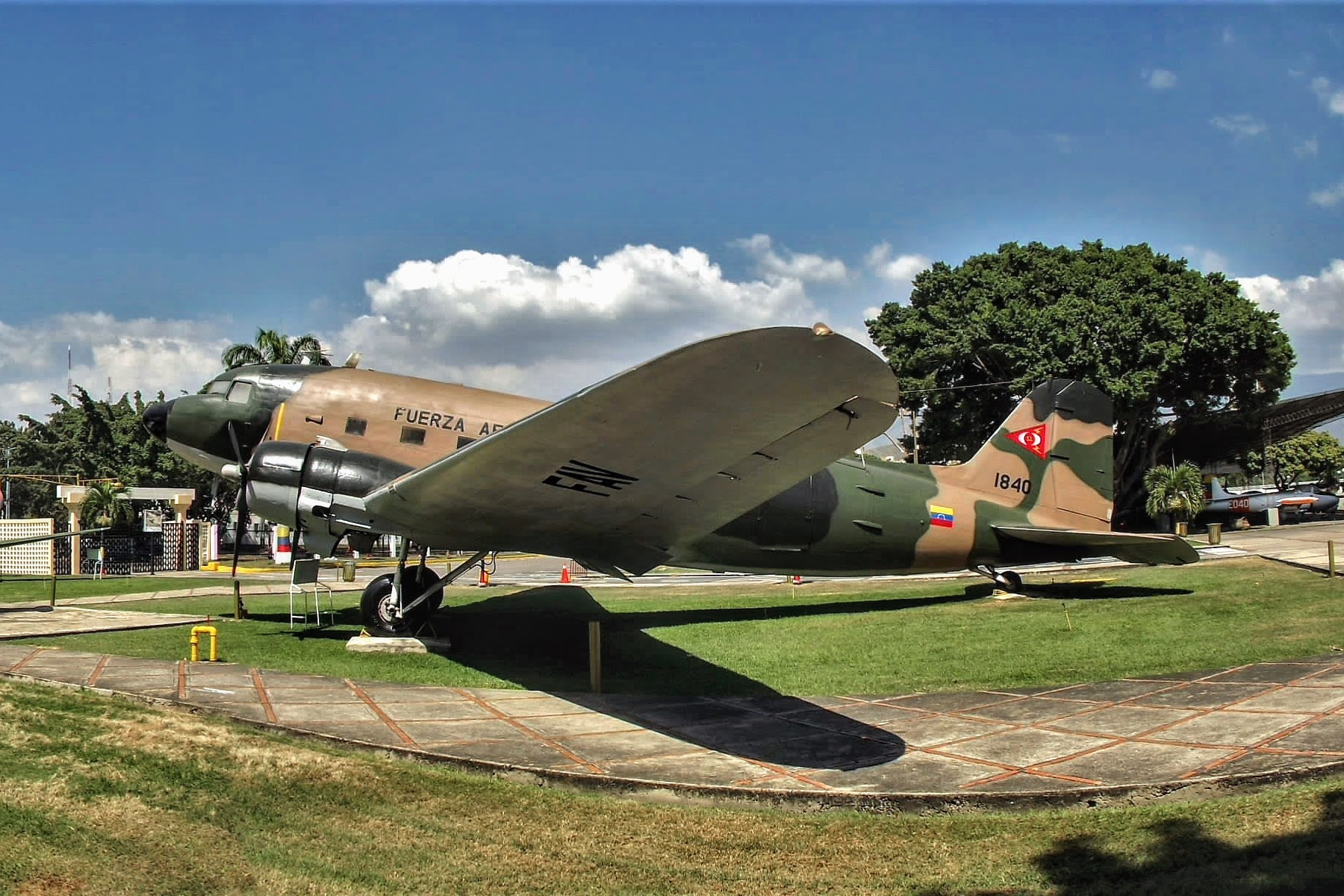
Douglas C-47A Skytrain of the Venezuelan Air Force

C-47
The initial military version of the DC-3 had four crew (pilot, co-pilot, navigator, and radio operator) and seats for 27 troops alongside the fuselage interior. "Aerial Ambulances" fitted for casualty evacuation could carry 18 stretcher cases and a medical crew of three; 965 were built (including 12 for the USN as the R4D-1).
C-47A
C-47 with a 24-volt electrical system, 5,254 built including USN aircraft designated R4D-5
RC-47A
C-47A equipped for photographic reconnaissance and ELINT missions
SC-47A
C-47A equipped for Search Air Rescue; redesignated HC-47A in 1962
VC-47A
C-47A equipped for VIP transport role
C-47B
Powered by R-1830-90 engines with two-speed superchargers (better altitude performance) to cover the China-Burma-India routes, 3,364 built
VC-47B
C-47B equipped for VIP transport role
XC-47C
C-47 tested with Edo Model 78 floats for possible use as a seaplane
C-47D
C-47B with second speed (high blower) of engine supercharger disabled or removed after the war
AC-47D Spooky
Gunship aircraft with three side-firing .30 in (7.62 mm) Minigun Gatling guns
EC-47D
C-47D with equipment for the Electronics Calibration, of which 26 were so converted by Hayes in 1953; prior to 1962 was designated AC-47D
NC-47D
C-47D modified for test roles
RC-47D
C-47D equipped for photographic reconnaissance and ELINT missions
SC-47D
C-47D equipped for Search Air Rescue; redesignated HC-47D in 1962
VC-47D
C-47D equipped for VIP transport role
C-47E
Modified cargo variant with space for 27–28 passengers or 18–24 litters
C-47F
YC-129 redesignated, Super DC-3 prototype for evaluation by USAF later passed to USN as XR4D-8
C-47L/M
C-47H/Js equipped for the support of American Legation United States Naval Attache (ALUSNA) and Military Assistance Advisory Group (MAAG) missions
EC-47N/P/Q
C-47A and D aircraft modified for ELINT/ARDF mission, N and P differ in radio bands covered, while Q replaces analog equipment found on the N and P with a digital suite, redesigned antenna equipment and uprated engines
C-47R
One C-47M modified for high altitude work, specifically for missions in Ecuador
C-53 Skytrooper
Troop transport version of the C-47 that lacked the reinforced cargo floor, large cargo door, and hoist attachment of the C-47 Skytrain. It was dedicated for the troop transport role and could carry 28 passengers in fixed metal seats arranged in rows in the former cargo space; 221 built.
XC-53A Skytrooper
One testbed aircraft modified in March 1942 with full-span slotted flaps and hot-air leading edge de-icing. Converted to C-53 standard in 1949 and sold as surplus.
C-53B Skytrooper
Winterized and long-range Arctic version of the C-53 with extra fuel tanks in the fuselage and separate navigator's astrodome station for celestial navigation; eight built.
C-53C Skytrooper
C-53 with larger port-side access door; 17 built.
C-53D Skytrooper
C-53C with 24V DC electrical system and its 28 seats attached to the sides of the fuselage; 159 built.
C-117A Skytrooper
C-47B with 24-seat airline-type interior for staff transport use, 16 built.
VC-117A
Three redesignated C-117s used in the VIP role
SC-117A
One C-117C converted for air-sea rescue
C-117B/VC-117B
High-altitude two-speed superchargers replaced by one-speed superchargers, one built and conversions from C-117As, all later VC-117B
C-117D
USN/USMC R4D-8 redesignated C-117D in 1962.
LC-117D
USN/USMC R4D-8L redesignated LC-117D in 1962.
TC-117D
USN/USMC R4D-8T redesignated TC-117D in 1962.
VC-117D
USN R4D-8Z redesignated VC-117D in 1962.
YC-129
Super DC-3 prototype for evaluation by USAF redesignated C-47F and later passed to USN as XR4D-8. Wright R-1820 engines uprated to 1425 hp.
CC-129
Canadian Forces designation for the C-47 (post-1970)
XCG-17
One C-47 tested as a 40-seat troop glider with engines removed and faired over
R4D-1 Skytrain
USN/USMC version of the C-47
R4D-3
Twenty C-53Cs transferred to USN
R4D-5
C-47A variant 24-volt electrical system replacing the 12-volt of the C-47; redesignated C-47H in 1962, 238 transferred from USAF
R4D-5L
R4D-5 for use in Antarctica. Redesignated LC-47H in 1962. Photos of this type show the removal of underslung engine oil coolers typical of the R-1830 engine installation; apparently not needed in the cold polar regions.
R4D-5Q
R4D-5 for use as special ECM trainer. Redesignated EC-47H in 1962
R4D-5R
R4D-5 for use as a personnel transport for 21 passengers and as a trainer aircraft; redesignated TC-47H in 1962
R4D-5S
R4D-5 for use as a special ASW trainer; redesignated SC-47H in 1962
R4D-5Z
R4D-5 for use as a VIP transport; redesignated VC-47H in 1962

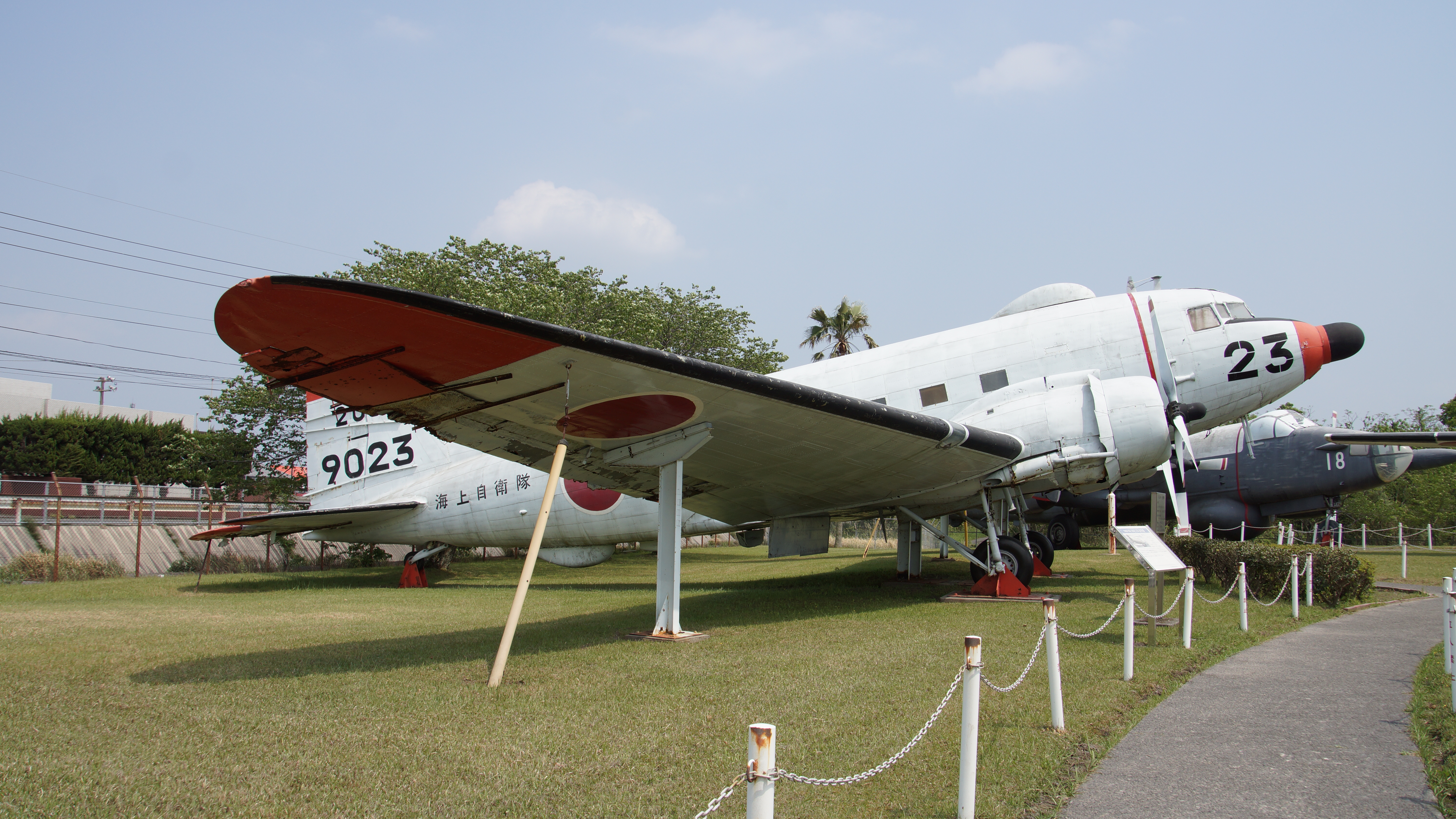
JMSDF R4D-6Q

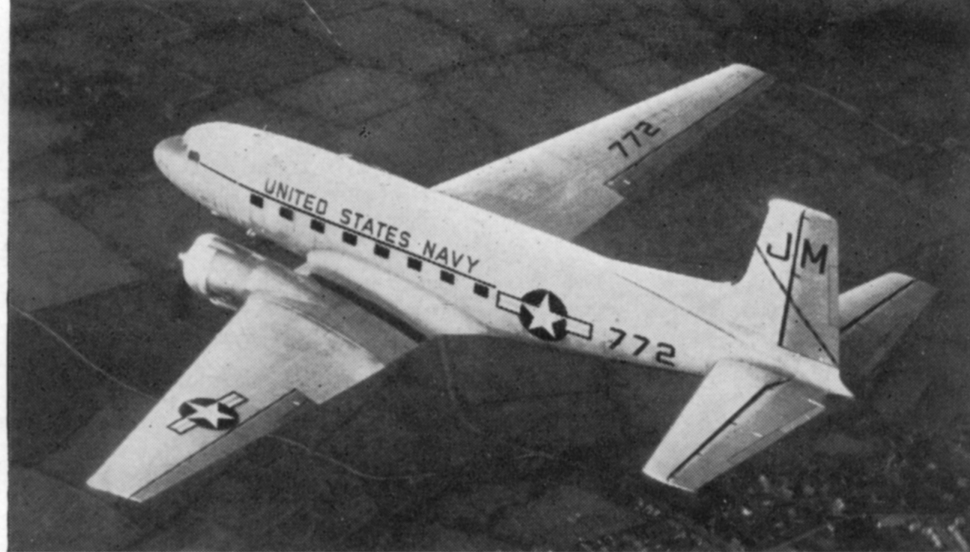
United States Navy R4D-8

R4D-6
:157 C-47Bs transferred to USN; redesignated C-47J in 1962
R4D-6L, Q, R, S, and Z
Variants as the R4D-5 series; redesignated LC-47J, EC-47J, TC-47J, SC-47J, and VC-47J respectively in 1962
R4D-7
44 TC-47Bs transferred from USAF for use as a navigational trainer; redesignated TC-47K in 1962
R4D-8
R4D-5 and R4D-6 remanufactured aircraft with stretched fuselage, Wright R-1820 engines, fitted with modified wings and redesigned tail surfaces; redesignated C-117D in 1962
R4D-8L
R4D-8 converted for Antarctic use, redesignated LC-117D in 1962
R4D-8T
R4D-8 converted as crew trainers, redesignated TC-117D in 1962
R4D-8Z
R4D-8 converted as a staff transport, redesignated VC-117D in 1962
C-47TP "Turbo Dak"
Refit with two Pratt & Whitney Canada PT6A-67R turboprops and fuselage stretch for the South African Air Force
Basler BT-67
C-47 conversion with a stretched fuselage, strengthened structure, modern avionics, and powered by two Pratt & Whitney Canada PT6A-67R turboprops

=== RAF designations ===
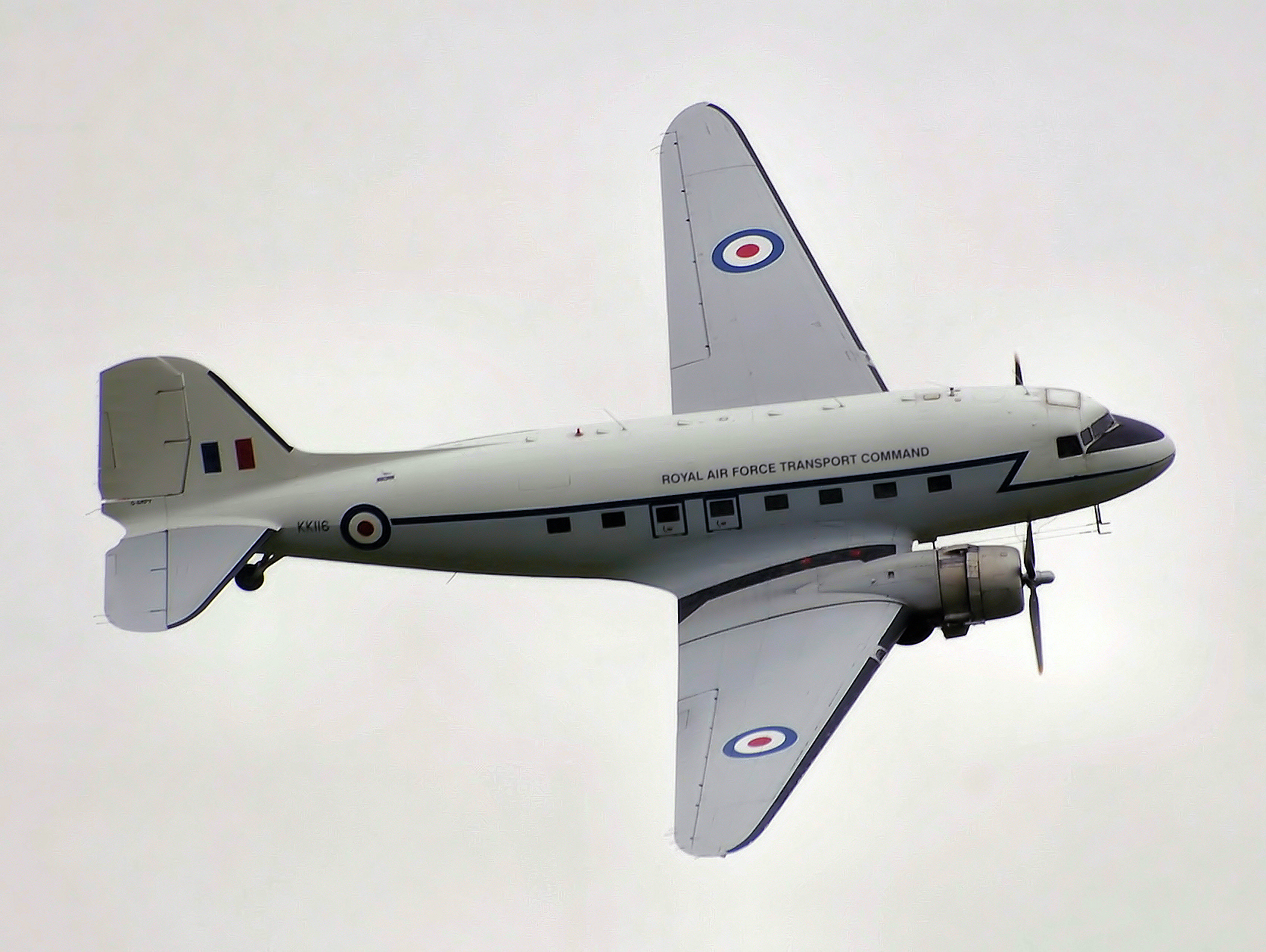
A Dakota IV in RAF Transport Command colors, owned by the Classic Air Force, operating out of Coventry Airport

Dakota I
RAF designation for the C-47 and R4D-1.
Dakota II
RAF designation for nine C-53 Skytroopers received under the lend lease scheme. Unlike the majority of RAF Dakotas, these aircraft were therefore dedicated troop transports, lacking the wide cargo doors and reinforced floor of the C-47.
Dakota III
RAF designation for the C-47A.
Dakota IV
RAF designation for the C-47B.
Airspeed AS.61
Projected conversion of Dakota I aircraft by Airspeed. None built.
Airspeed AS.62
Projected conversion of Dakota II aircraft by Airspeed. None built.
Airspeed AS.63
Projected conversion of Dakota III aircraft by Airspeed. None built.
BEA Pionair/Dart-Dakota
Conversion of Dakota to Rolls-Royce Dart power and used by BEA to prove turboprop engines prior to entry into service of Vickers Viscount.

=== Royal Thai Air Force designations ===
B.L.2
(Thai: บ.ล.๒) designation for the C-47.
B.TL.2
(Thai: บ.ตล.๒) designation for the RC-47.

== Operators ==
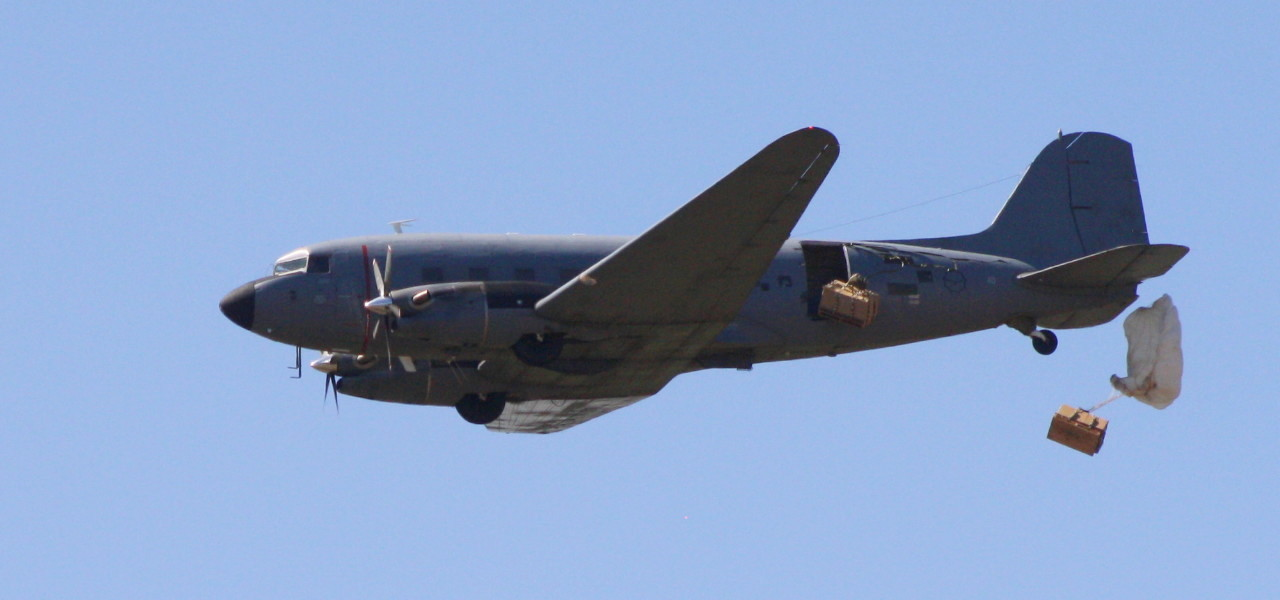
South African Air Force C-47TP "Turbo Dak"

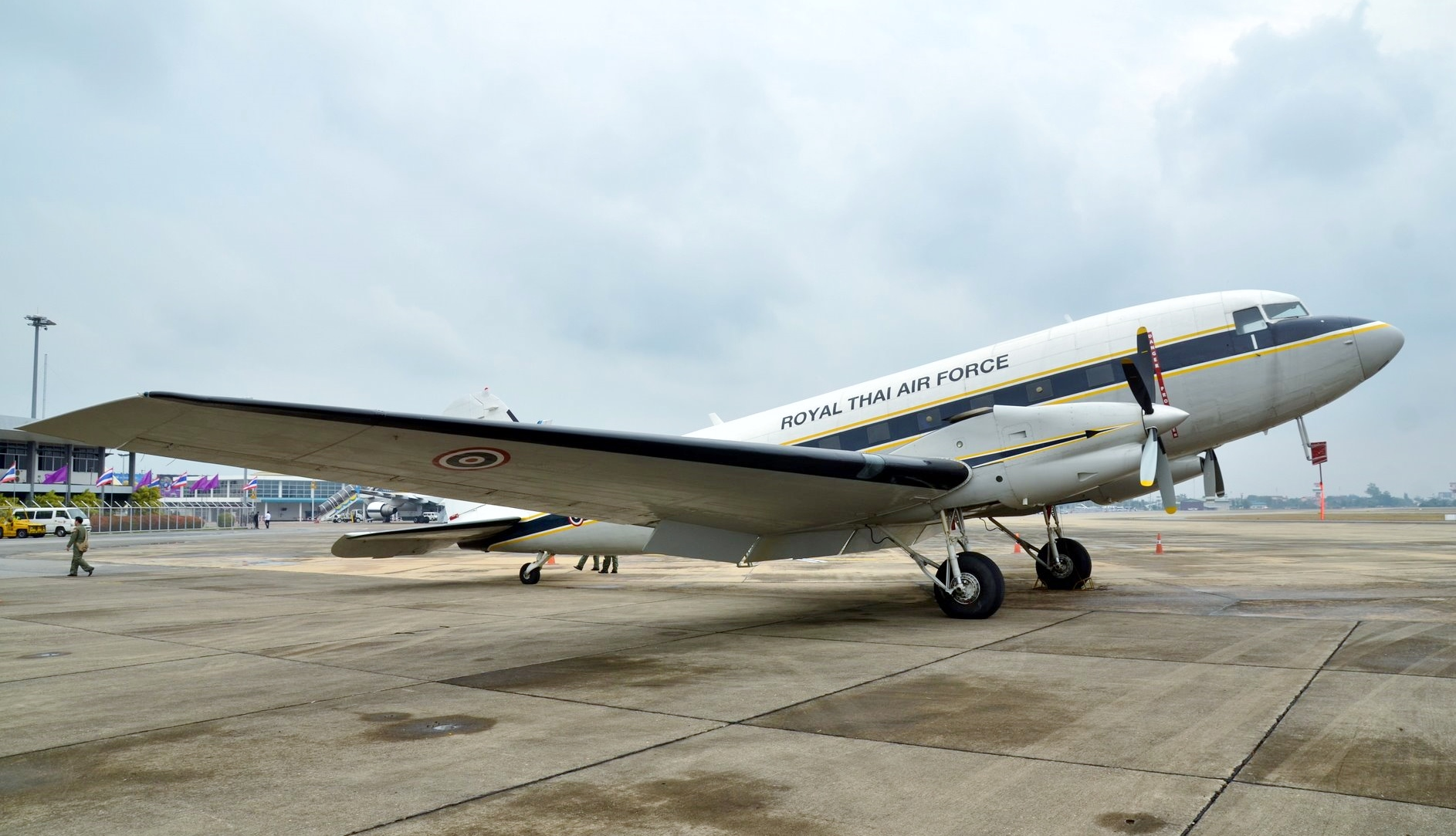
A Royal Thai Air Force Basler BT-67 (C-47 conversion with Pratt & Whitney turboprops and stretched fuselage)

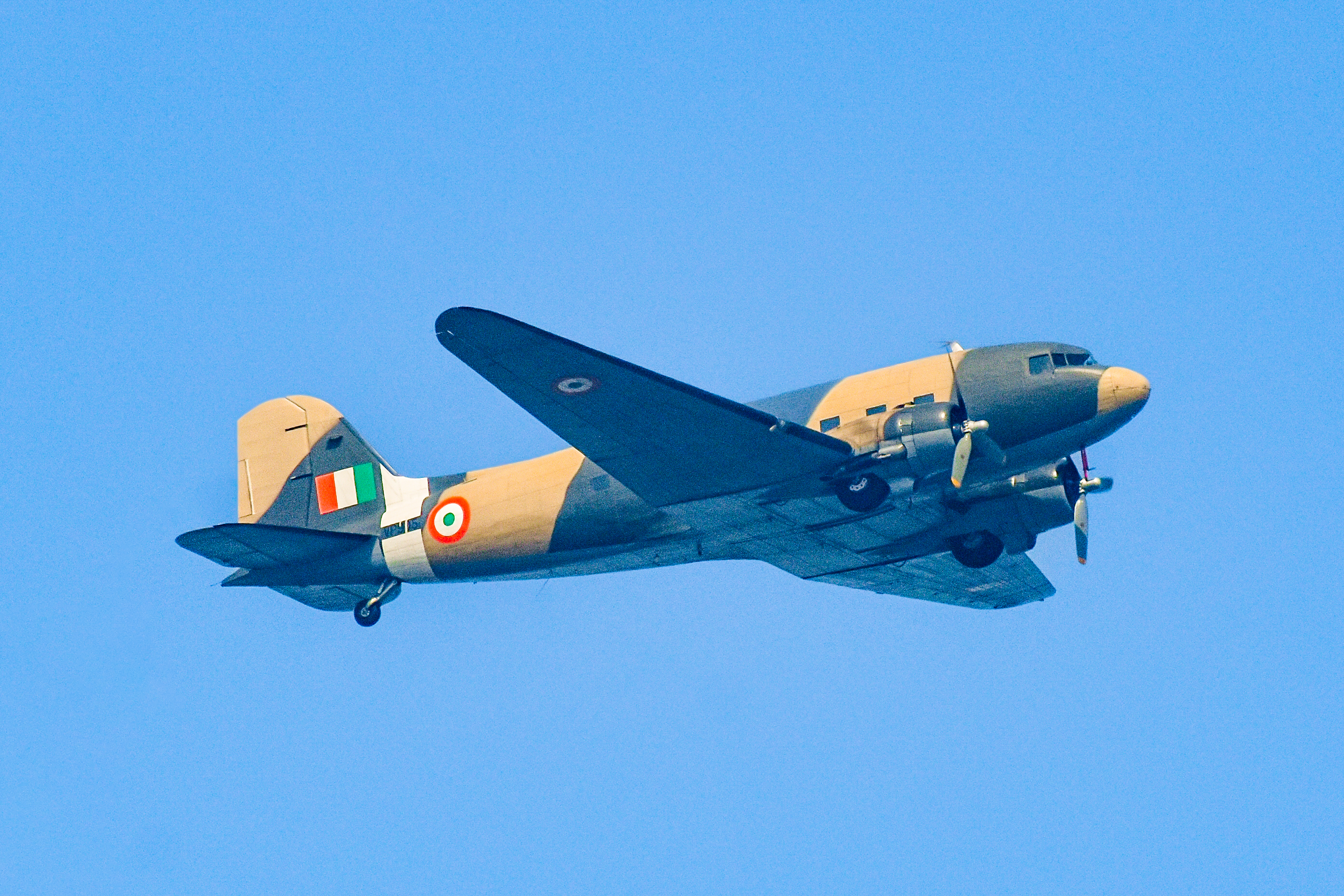
The IAF's heritage aircraft, Douglas C-47 Skytrain (Dakota), during the Republic Day Flypast 2024.

- Argentina
- Australia
- Belgium
- Benin
- Biafra
- Bangladesh
- Bolivia
- Brazil
- Burma
- Cambodia
- Canada
- Chad
- Chile
- China
- Colombia
- Republic of the Congo
- Democratic Republic of the Congo
- Cuba
- Czechoslovakia
- Denmark
- Dominican Republic
- Ecuador
- Egypt
- El Salvador
- Ethiopia
- Finland
- France
- Gabon
- Greece
- Guatemala
- Haiti
- Honduras
- Hungary
- Iceland
- India
- Indonesia
- Iran
- Israel
- Italy
- Ivory Coast
- Jordan
- Japan
- Kenya
- Laos
- Libya
- Madagascar
- Malawi
- Mali
- Mauritania
- Mexico
- Monaco
- Morocco
- Netherlands
- New Zealand
- Nicaragua
- Niger
- Nigeria
- Northern Rhodesia
- Norway
- Oman
- Pakistan
- Panama
- Papua New Guinea
- Paraguay
- Peru
- Philippines
- Poland
- Portugal
- Rhodesia
- Romania
- Rwanda
- Saudi Arabia
- Senegal
- South Africa
- South Korea
- South Vietnam
- Somalia
- Soviet Union (also as Lisunov Li-2)
- Sri Lanka
- Spain
- Sweden
- Syria
- Taiwan
- Tanzania
- Thailand
- Togo
- Turkey
- Uganda
- Uruguay
- United Kingdom
- United States
- Venezuela
- Vietnam
- West Germany
- Yemen
- Yugoslavia
- Zaire
- Zambia

== Surviving aircraft ==
Large numbers of C-47s, C-117s and other variants survive, on display in museums or as monuments; operated as warbirds; or remaining in service.

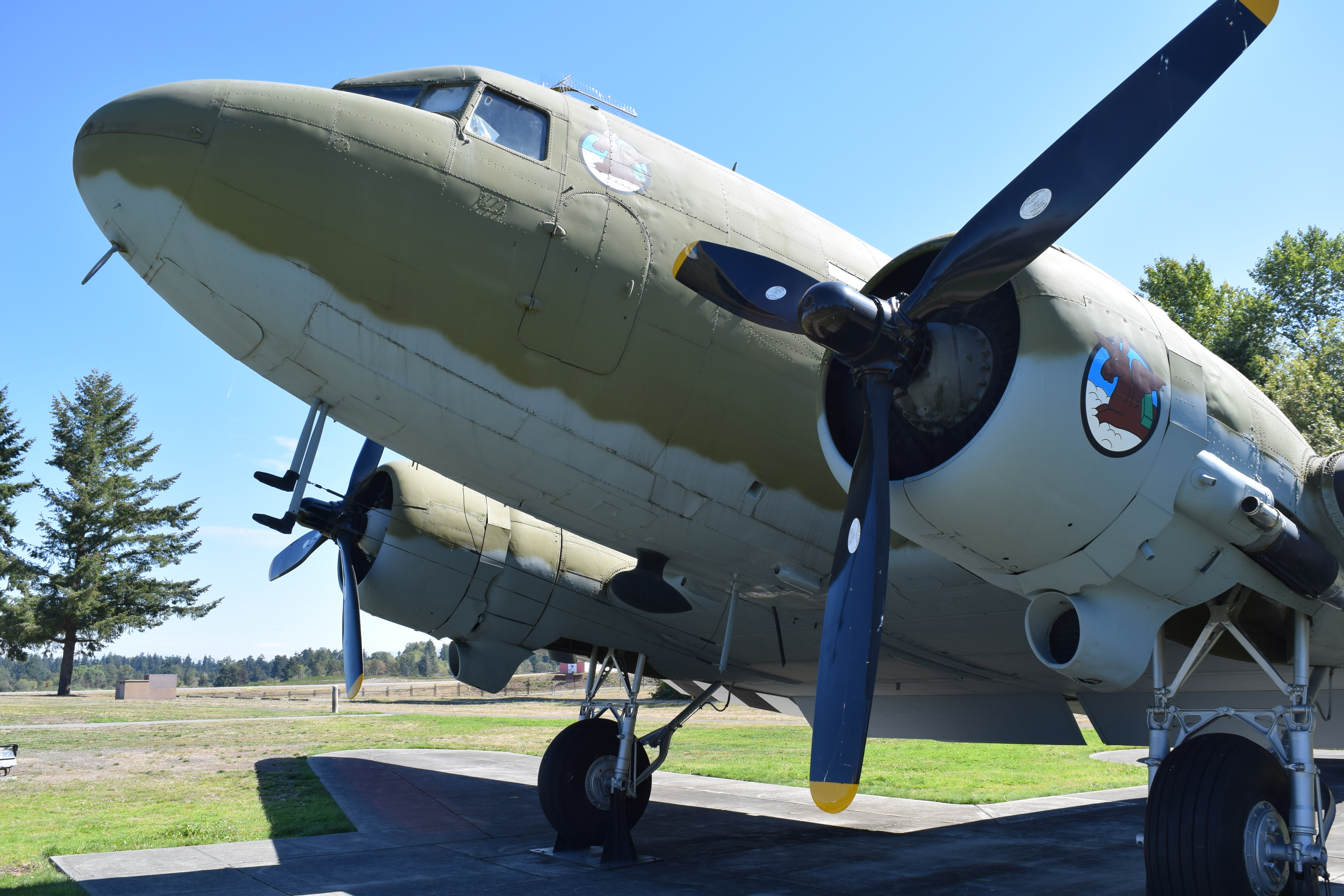
TC-47D on display at McChord AFB, 2016

As part of the 75th-anniversary commemoration in June 2019, 14 American C-47s and another group of 'Daks' from Europe retraced the route across the English Channel to Normandy taken by roughly 850 of these aircraft on D-Day. Among them were That's All, Brother, Betsy's Biscuit Bomber, Miss Montana, Spirit of Benovia, D-Day Doll, Boogie Baby, N47E Miss Virginia, and Whiskey 7.

== Specifications (C-47B-DK) ==
Douglas C-47 Skytrain 3-view drawing

Data from McDonnell Douglas aircraft since 1920 : Volume I

General characteristics

- Crew: 4 (pilot, co-pilot, navigator, radio operator)
- Capacity: 28 troops or 6,000 lb (2,700 kg) of cargo
- Length: 63 ft 9 in (19.43 m)
- Wingspan: 95 ft 6 in (29.11 m)
- Height: 17 ft 0 in (5.18 m)
- Wing area: 987 sq ft (91.7 m^{2})
- Airfoil: root: NACA 2215; tip: NACA 2206
- Empty weight: 18,135 lb (8,226 kg)
- Gross weight: 26,000 lb (11,793 kg)
- Max takeoff weight: 31,000 lb (14,061 kg)
- Powerplant: 2 × Pratt & Whitney R-1830-90C Twin Wasp 14-cylinder air-cooled radial piston engines
  - 1,200 hp (890 kW) takeoff rating
  - 1,000 hp (750 kW) normal rating at 14,500 ft (4,400 m)
- Propellers: 3-bladed constant-speed propellers

Performance

- Maximum speed: 224 mph (360 km/h, 195 kn) at 10,000 ft (3,000 m)
- Cruise speed: 160 mph (260 km/h, 140 kn)
- Range: 1,600 mi (2,600 km, 1,400 nmi) normal range
- Ferry range: 3,600 mi (5,800 km, 3,100 nmi)
- Service ceiling: 26,400 ft (8,000 m)
- Time to altitude: 10,000 ft (3,000 m) in 9 minutes 30 seconds
- Wing loading: 26.3 lb/sq ft (128 kg/m^{2})
- Power/mass: 0.0926 hp/lb (0.1522 kW/kg)

== See also ==
Related development

- Basler BT-67
- Conroy Turbo-Three
- Douglas AC-47 Spooky
- Douglas DC-3
- Douglas R4D-8/C-117D
- Douglas XCG-17
- Lisunov Li-2
- Showa/Nakajima L2D

Aircraft of comparable role, configuration, and era

- Curtiss C-46 Commando
- Junkers Ju 52/3m

Related lists

- List of aircraft of World War II
- List of military aircraft of the United States
- List of United States Navy aircraft designations (pre-1962)
- List of non-carrier aircraft flown from aircraft carriers
