= 1973 Sólheimasandur Douglas C-117D crash =

1973 aviation accident in Iceland

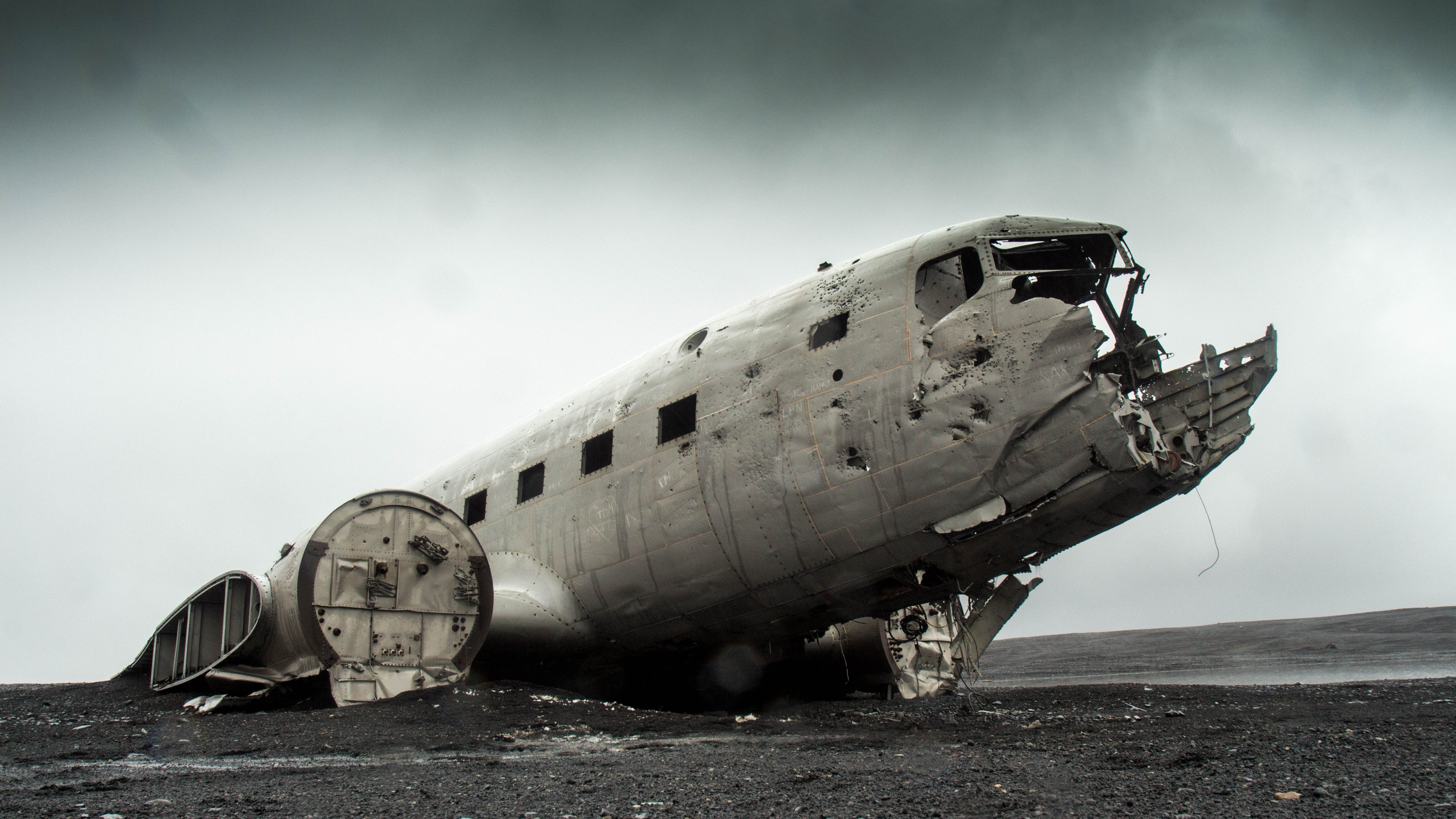
- Wreckage of the aircraft in 2015

Accident
- Date: 21 November 1973
- Summary: Icing conditions
- Site: Near Sólheimasandur; 63°27′32.70″N 19°21′53.37″W

Aircraft
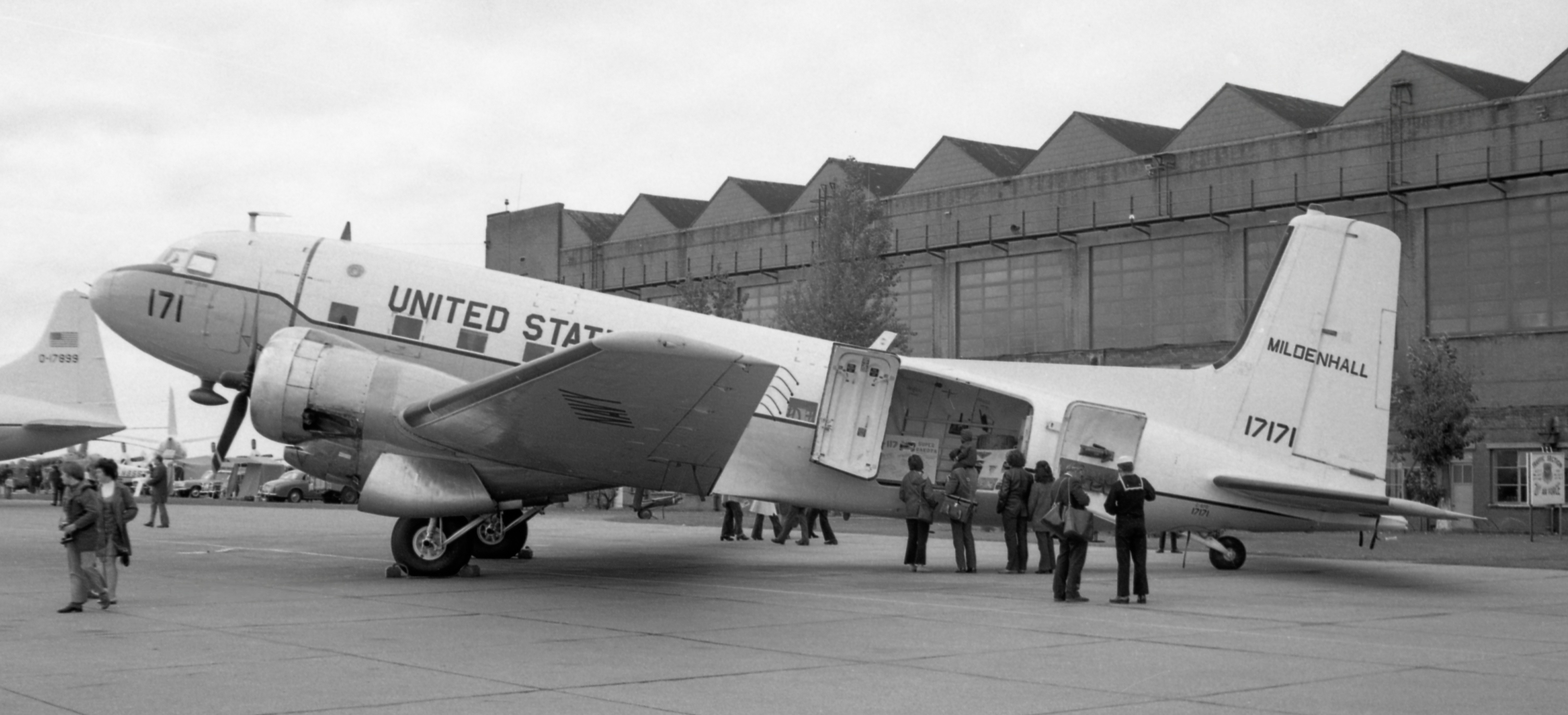
- 17171, the aircraft involved in the accident, seen in 1972
- Aircraft type: Douglas C-117D
- Operator: United States Navy
- Registration: 17171
- Flight origin: Hornafjörður Airport (HFN/BIHN), Iceland
- Destination: Naval Air Station Keflavik
- Crew: 7
- Fatalities: 0
- Survivors: 7

On 21 November 1973, a Douglas C-117D transport aircraft operated by the United States Navy crashed onto Sólheimasandur sandy beachline in southern Iceland during severe icing conditions. All seven crewmembers on board survived the accident, and the aircraft was written off. The main fuselage wreckage has remained relatively intact since the accident, leading to the crash site becoming a tourist destination.

== Accident ==
The aircraft involved in the accident was flying from Hofn Hornafjördur Airport to Naval Air Station Keflavik, after delivering supplies for the radar station at Stokksnes. En route the aircraft encountered severe icing and the crew were forced to land on a frozen river at Sólheimasandur. All seven crew members survived and were rescued by helicopter, but the aircraft was written off ('surveyed' in US Navy parlance). The unsalvaged remains of the aircraft were left at the scene.

== The pilot's recollections ==
In an interview with Morgunblaðið in 2025 Gregory Fletcher, the pilot who crash-landed a Douglas R4D/C-117D aircraft on Sólheimasandur in November 1973, recalls the dramatic incident. About 45 minutes after takeoff, ice began to form on the aircraft, eventually reaching a critical level. Like many planes from the World War II era, this particular Douglas aircraft used a traditional carburetor system, requiring oxygen to be mixed with fuel for combustion. The ice blocked this process, causing both engines to fail. Fletcher describes how the pilot-in-command and the flight engineer worked desperately to restart the engines while he focused on keeping the aircraft stable and figuring out their position and heading—no easy task in an era before GPS navigation. At that moment, Fletcher made a crucial decision: their chances of survival would be greater if they landed in the ocean rather than on the glacier. He turned the plane south, heading for the coastline.

== Aircraft ==
The aircraft, serial number 17171, was designated C-117D and was based on the Super DC-3, first flown in 1944. This R4D-8 was built as an R4D-5 (msn 12554) and converted to R4D-8 (msn 43309) in November 1951. All R4D-8 aircraft still extant were re-designated as C-117D in the tri-service designation system introduced from 18 September 1962.

== Tourist site ==
As of 2024, the fuselage of the aircraft remains relatively intact, and the site has become a popular tourist destination. The wreck has accumulated superficial damage from graffiti, gunfire, and tourists over the years. Tours to the site are available, and the trek back and forth takes about two to three hours.

In January 2020, two Chinese tourists died of hypothermia near the wreckage after getting caught in a storm. A month later, search and rescue units had to rescue several tourists who had ignored a warning from the police to not trek to the wreckage due to deteriorating weather in the area.

== Popular culture ==
- The crash site was featured in the music video of Justin Bieber's 2015 song "I'll Show You".
- American musician George Hirsch's 2016 album Hijrah used an image of the Sólheimasandur crash as its cover.
- The music video for the song "Gerua", from the Indian film Dilwale was shot at this site, in which lead actors Shah Rukh Khan and Kajol are seen standing on the wreckage. The site gained popularity among Indian tourists after the release of the song
- The site was also featured in the music video "Let Me In", an orchestral ballad song that introduced the member Haseul of the Korean girl group Loona.
- The site is featured in start of season 12 of the Dutch reality TV game show Wie is de Mol?
- The site is featured on the cover art of "Collide" by Elektronomia.
