= Fowler Ice Rise =

Geographical feature in the Antarctic

Fowler Ice Rise (77°30′S 78°0′W) is a very large Antarctic ice rise between Evans Ice Stream and Carlson Inlet, in the southwest part of the Ronne Ice Shelf. The feature appears to be completely ice-covered except for the Haag Nunataks, which protrude above the surface in the northwestern portion. It was mapped by the United States Geological Survey from Landsat imagery taken 1973–74, and named by the Advisory Committee on Antarctic Names for Captain Alfred N. Fowler, U.S. Navy, Commander of the U.S. Naval Support Force, Antarctica, 1972–74.
