= Douglas R4D-8 =

Military transport aircraft

R4D-8/C-117D
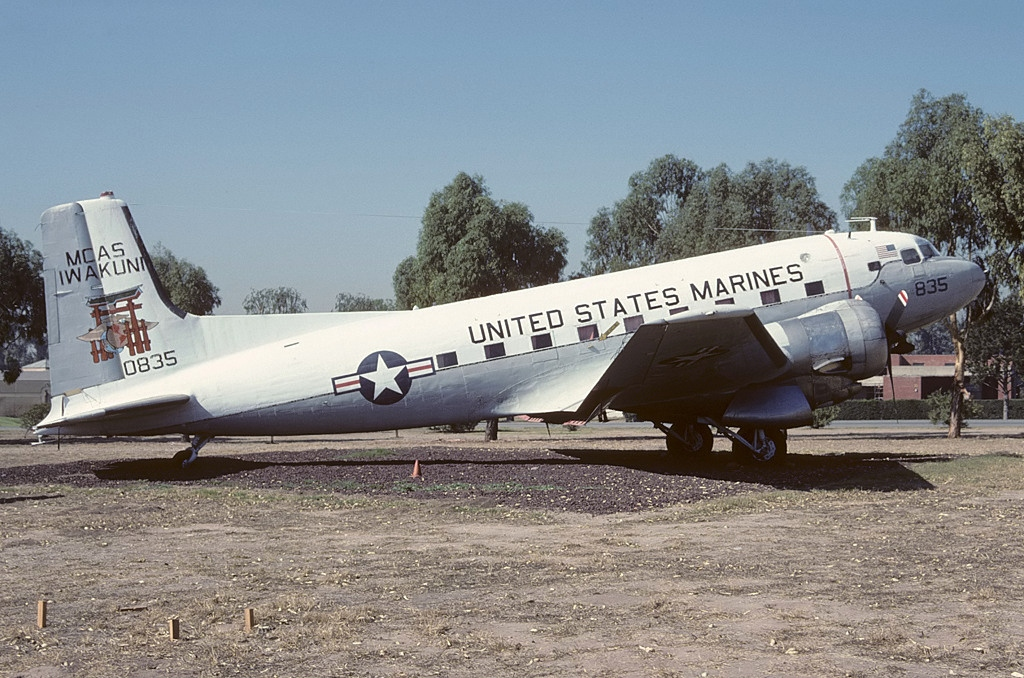
- A USMC C-117D formerly based at MCAS Iwakuni now on display at MCAS Miramar

General information
- Type: Military transport aircraft
- National origin: United States
- Manufacturer: Douglas Aircraft Company
- Primary users: United States Navy United States Marine Corps
- Number built: 100 (by conversion)

History
- First flight: 23 June 1949
- Retired: 1992
- Developed from: Douglas DC-3; Douglas C-47 Skytrain

The Douglas R4D-8 (later redesignated C-117D) is a military transport aircraft that was developed from the civilian Douglas DC-3S (Super DC-3) airliner. It was used by the United States Navy and United States Marine Corps during the Korean War and Vietnam War.

== Design and development ==
During World War II, the armed forces of many countries used the C-47 and modified DC-3s for the transport of troops, cargo, and wounded. The US Navy designation was R4D. More than 10,000 aircraft were produced in Long Beach and Santa Monica, California, and Oklahoma City, Oklahoma. Between March 1943 and August 1945, the Oklahoma City plant produced 5,354 C-47s.

=== Super DC-3 ===
Large numbers of DC-3s and surplus C-47s were in commercial use in the 1940s. In response to proposed changes to the Civil Air Regulations airworthiness requirements that would restrict use of these aircraft, Douglas offered a conversion to improve takeoff and single-engine performance.

The fuselage of the DC-3S or "Super DC-3", was strengthened and lengthened by 3 ft 3 in (0.99 m) ahead of the wings. The wing center section remained the same but the outer wing panels had a 4° trailing edge sweep and squared-off wingtips that reduced the wingspan by 5 ft 5 in (1.65 m). There was also a new square tail fin with a large dorsal fillet that was 1 ft (0.30 m) taller than the DC-3's to compensate for the increased torque from more powerful engines. Either 1,475 hp (1,100 kW) Wright R-1820-80 Cyclones or 1,450 hp (1,080 kW) Pratt & Whitney R-2000 Twin Wasps with short, jet ejection-type exhaust stacks could be fitted.

Other features included a fully enclosed retractable landing gear, a small airliner style door, a partially retractable tailwheel, flush rivets, and low-drag antennas. With greater than 75% of the original DC-3/C-47 configuration changed, it was almost a new aircraft. The DC-3S made its first flight on 23 June 1949. The changes met the new FAR 4B airworthiness requirements and 38 passengers could be carried, with increased speed to compete with newer airliners. Douglas offered to convert existing aircraft for $150,000 per aircraft, however little interest was expressed by commercial operators. Several factors led to the DC-3S being rejected by the airlines, including a glut of much cheaper ex-military transport aircraft, including newer more capable designs, available for use as civil airliners. As a result, only three were sold to Capital Airlines.

=== YC-129/YC-47F/R4D-8X ===
During the later part of World War II, the United States Army Air Forces ordered a 21 seat VIP transport version of the C-47B and Douglas delivered 17 during 1944/45. These had 1,200 hp Pratt & Whitney R1830 engines, smaller airliner style doors, and were given the designation C-117A. Several were later modified by replacing their two-stage superchargers with single-stage superchargers and given the new designation C-117B. A number of VC-47 VIP transports were also modified to C-117B standard and given the designation C-117C. The USN and USMC also had their versions of the C-47 designated R4D-1, R4D-3, R4D-5, R4D-6, and R4D-7.

Having failed to sell the DC-3S to the airlines Douglas offered a 21 seat VIP transport version with a similar configuration as the C-117B to the USAF and was evaluated under the designation YC-129, later redesignated YC-47F. The USAF declined to buy the YC-129 and opted instead for a version of the Convair CV-240 which was given the designation C-131 Samaritan. The USAF transferred the YC-129 to the United States Navy for evaluation during 1951 and it was given the Navy designation R4D-8X. Unlike the USAF the USN ordered Douglas to convert 100 existing R4D-5s, R4D-6s, and R4D-7s to the same configuration as the R4D-8X and given the designation R4D-8, which was later redesignated C-117D in 1962.

The empty and loaded weight of the R4D-8 increased but so did top speed 270 mph (230 kn; 430 km/h) and cruise speed 250 mph (220 kn; 400 km/h). Fuel capacity also doubled to 1,330 US gal (1,110 imp gal; 5,000 L) and despite doubling the fuel capacity range was only increased to 2,500 mi (4,000 km). In USN and USMC service the R4D-8 was mostly used as a transport and was also used by the USN parachute demonstration team the "Chuting Stars".

== Operational history ==
=== Korean War ===
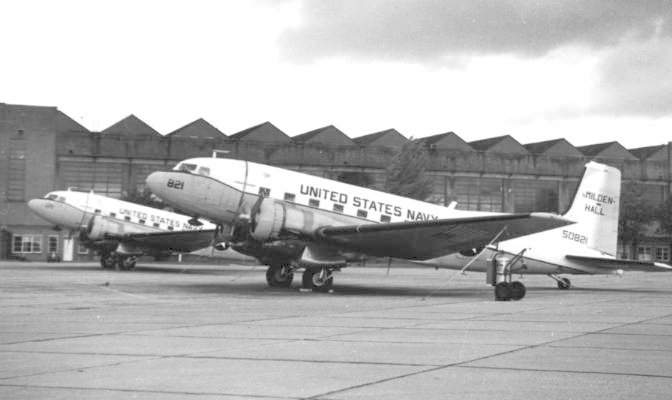
U.S. Navy C-117Ds at RAF Mildenhall in 1967

R4D-8s were used as staff transports as well as para dropping supplies and flares during the Korean War.

=== Vietnam War ===
C-117Ds were used as staff transports and some were converted to ELINT aircraft as well as dropping flares during the Vietnam War.

=== Operation Deep Freeze ===
Four R4D-8Ls participated in Operation Deep Freeze and three were lost.

=== Civil ===
1 C-117 remains in service with Alaska based transNorthern. its currently configured as a cargo airplane. it was acquired by transNorthern in 2007 from kenn borek air. it is currently registered as N28TN. transNorthern also has a second C-117 in storage, registered as N30TN. this airplane is fitted with a passenger cabin, it hasn't flown since about 2019

== Variants ==
YC-129
DC-3S prototype for evaluation by USAF redesignated C-47F and later passed to USN as R4D-8X.
R4D-8
Remanufactured R4D-5, R4D-6, and R4D-7 aircraft with stretched fuselage, Wright R-1820 engines, fitted with modified wings and redesigned tail surfaces; redesignated C-117D in 1962.
R4D-8L
R4D-8 converted for Antarctic use with deleted oil coolers, ski landing gear, nose mounted weather radar, and JATO gear redesignated LC-117D in 1962.
R4D-8T
R4D-8 navigation trainer, redesignated TC-117D in 1962.
R4D-8Z
R4D-8 converted as a staff transport, redesignated VC-117D in 1962.

== Operators ==
United States

- United States Navy
- United States Marine Corps

== Incidents and accidents ==
- 1973 Sólheimasandur Douglas DC-3 crash
- BuNo. 17154 named "Negatus Perspirus" crashed at Byrd Station Antarctica on January 6, 1960.
- BuNo. 17219 named "Semper Shafters USMC" damaged on landing and abandoned at Horlick Mountains Antarctica on November 12, 1961.
- BuNo. 17188 crashed at Sentinel Range Antarctica on November 22, 1962.

== Surviving aircraft ==
=== Bolivia ===
- 17190 – C-117D airworthy with Lineas Aéreas Canedo in Cochabamba.

=== Iceland ===
- 17191 – C-117D in storage at the Egill Olafsson Museum in Hnjotur, Vesturbyggð.

=== New Zealand ===
- 17221 – LC-47H on display at the Ferrymead Aeronautical Society in Christchurch.

=== United States ===
- 12343 – C-117D stored at El Paso INTL airport
- 12437 – C-117D on display at Northwest Regional Airport near Roanoke, Texas.
- 39080 – C-117D airworthy with MES in Anchorage, Alaska.
- 04122 – C-117D in storage with TransNorthern
- 50821 – C-117D on static display at the National Naval Aviation Museum in Pensacola, Florida.
- 50826 – C-117D on static display at the Pima Air & Space Museum in Tucson, Arizona.
- 50835 – C-117D stored at the Flying Leatherneck Aviation Museum in Irvine, California.

== Specifications ==
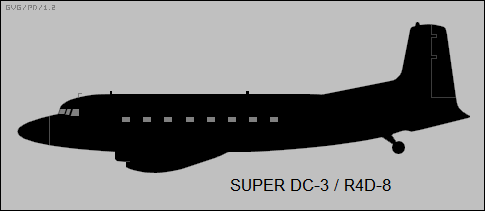

Data from

General characteristics

- Crew: 4 (pilot, co-pilot, navigator, radio operator)
- Capacity: 21-32
- Length: 67 ft 9 in (20.65 m)
- Wingspan: 90 ft (27 m)
- Height: 18 ft 3 in (5.56 m)
- Wing area: 969 sq ft (90.0 m^{2})
- Empty weight: 19,537 lb (8,862 kg)
- Max takeoff weight: 31,000 lb (14,061 kg)
- Fuel capacity: 1,330 US gal (1,110 imp gal; 5,000 L)
- Powerplant: 2 × Wright R-1820-80 Cyclone 9-cylinder air-cooled radial piston engines, 1,475 hp (1,100 kW) each
- Propellers: 3-bladed constant-speed propellers

Performance

- Maximum speed: 270 mph (430 km/h, 230 kn) at 5,900 ft (1,800 m)
- Cruise speed: 250 mph (400 km/h, 220 kn)
- Range: 2,500 mi (4,000 km, 2,200 nmi)
- Ferry range: 3,042 mi (4,896 km, 2,643 nmi)
- Service ceiling: 22,500 ft (6,900 m)
- Rate of climb: 1,300 ft/min (6.6 m/s)
- Wing loading: 32 lb/sq ft (160 kg/m^{2})
- Power/mass: 10.5 lb/hp (4.8 kg/hp)

== Gallery ==
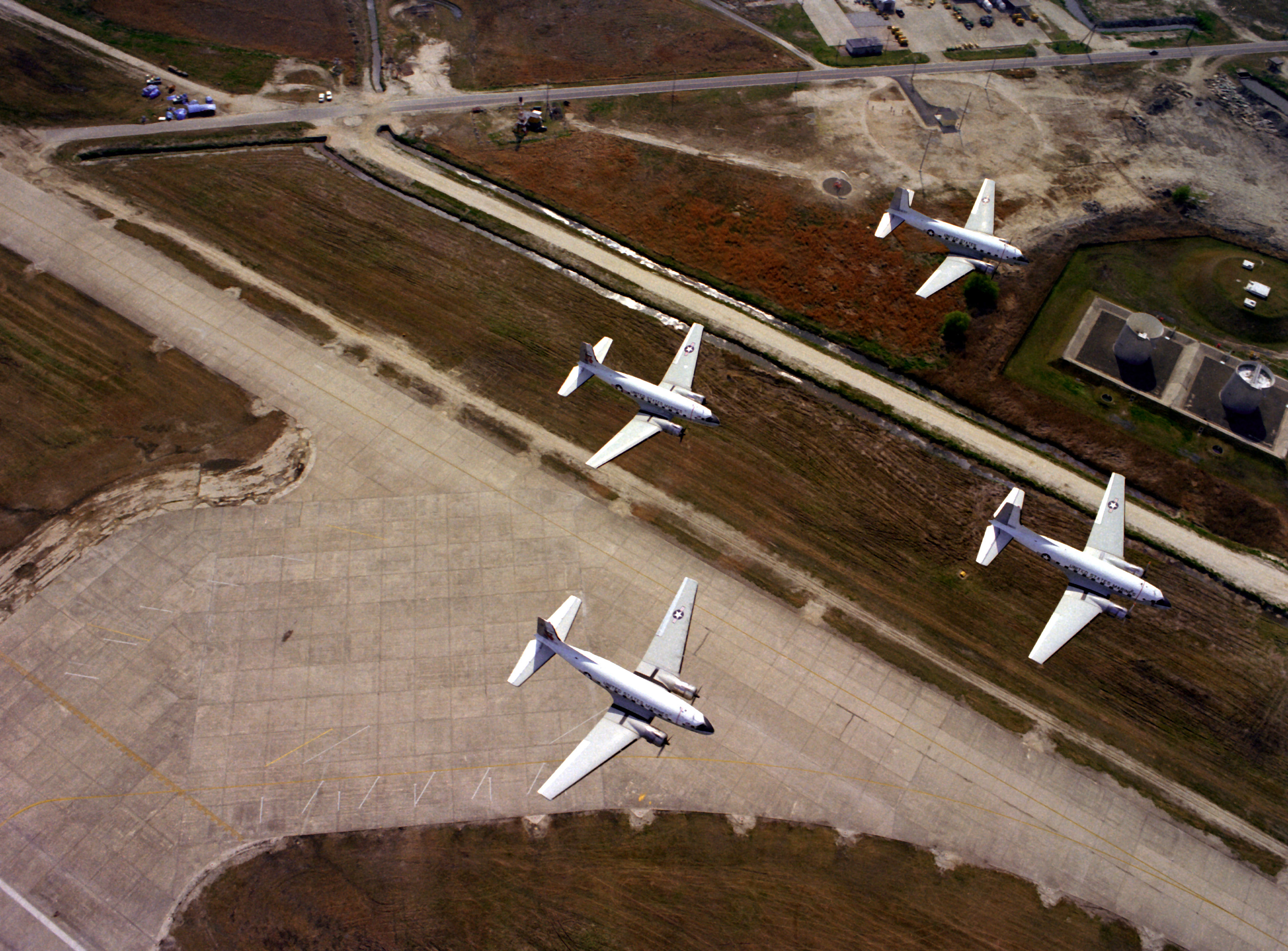
C-117Ds flying over MCAS Iwakuni 1981. One of these aircraft is now on display at MCAS Miramar.

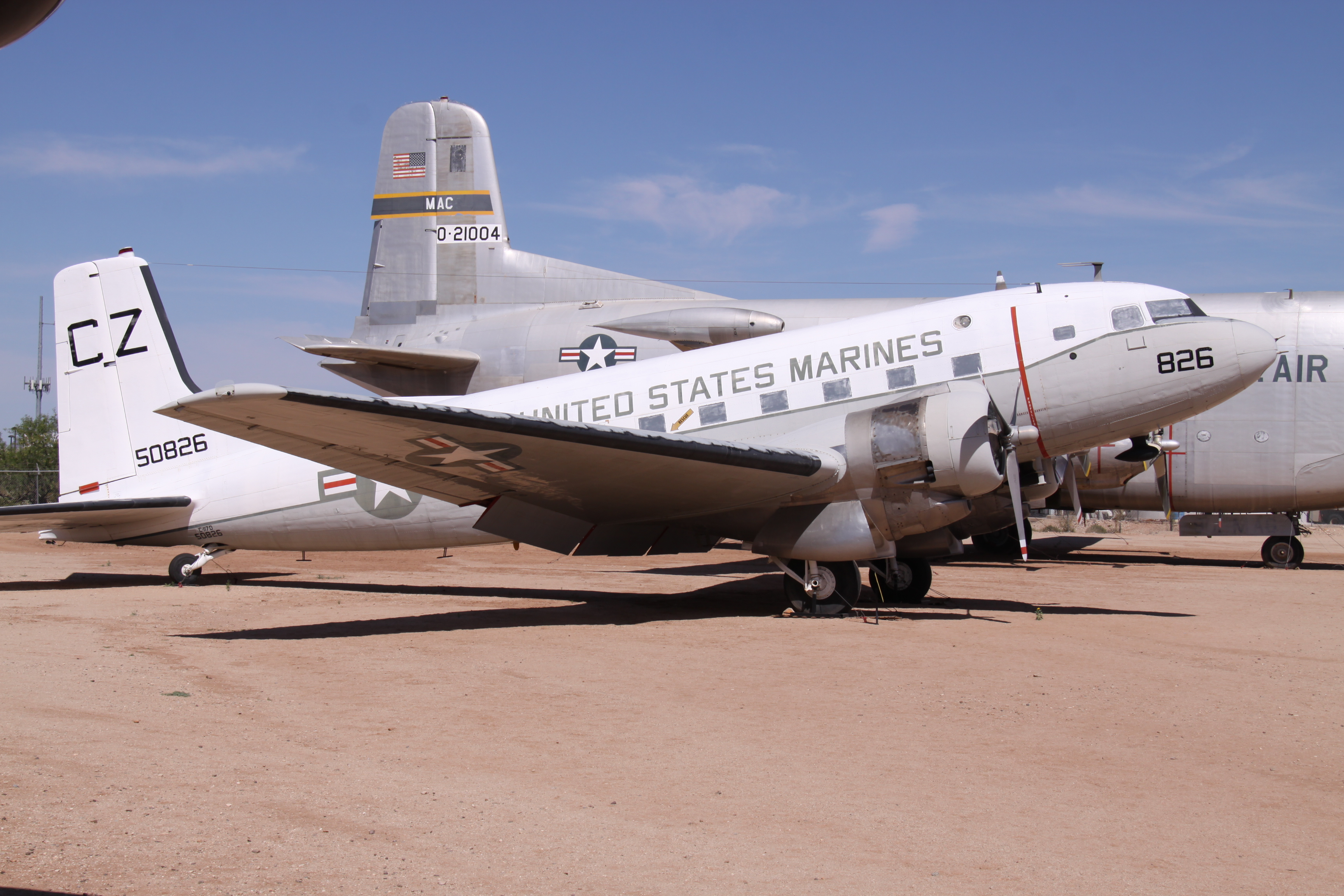
A C-117D at the Pima Air & Space Museum.

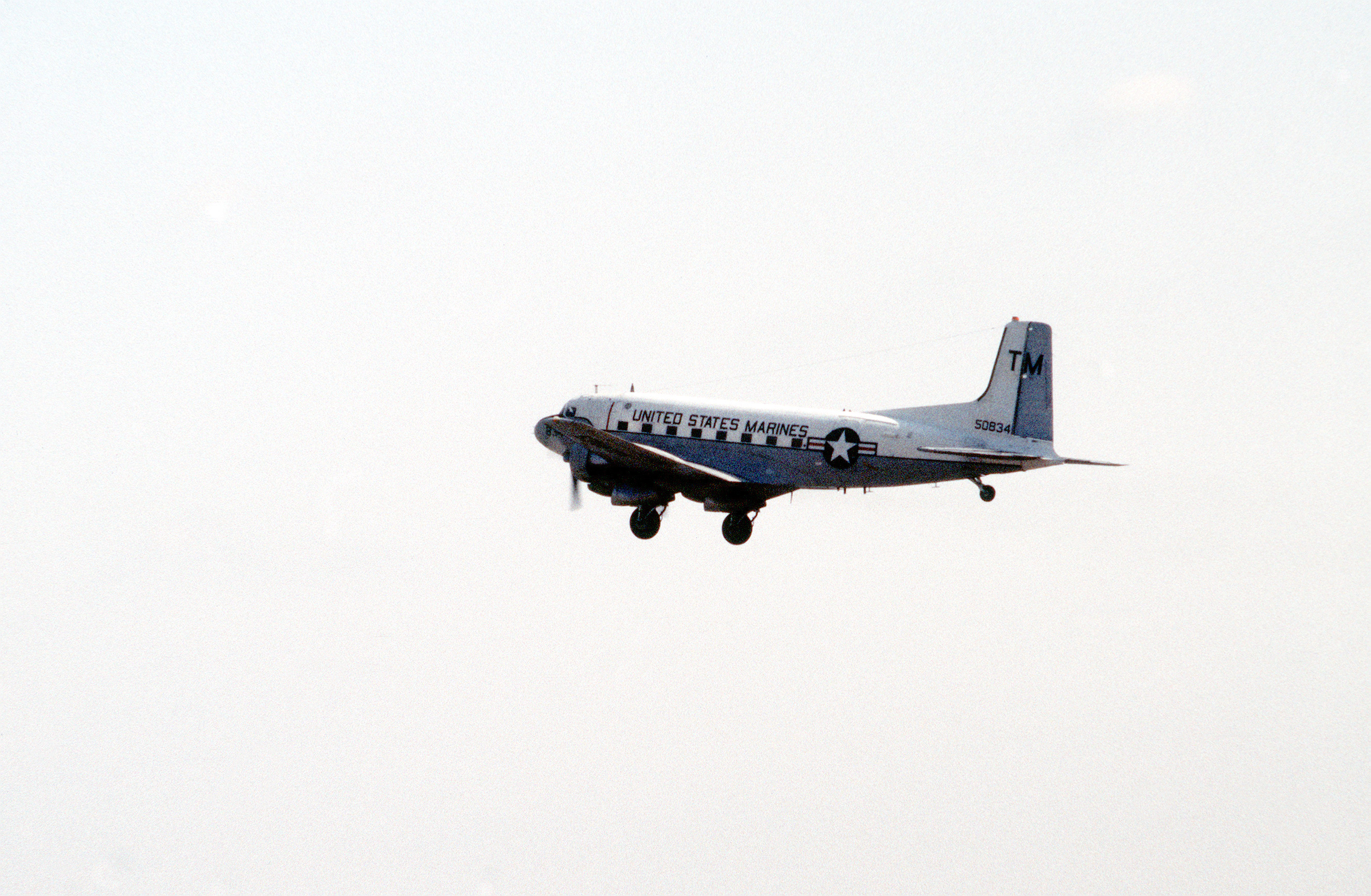
The final flight of a USMC C-117D in 1992. This aircraft is now on display at MCAS Cherry Point.

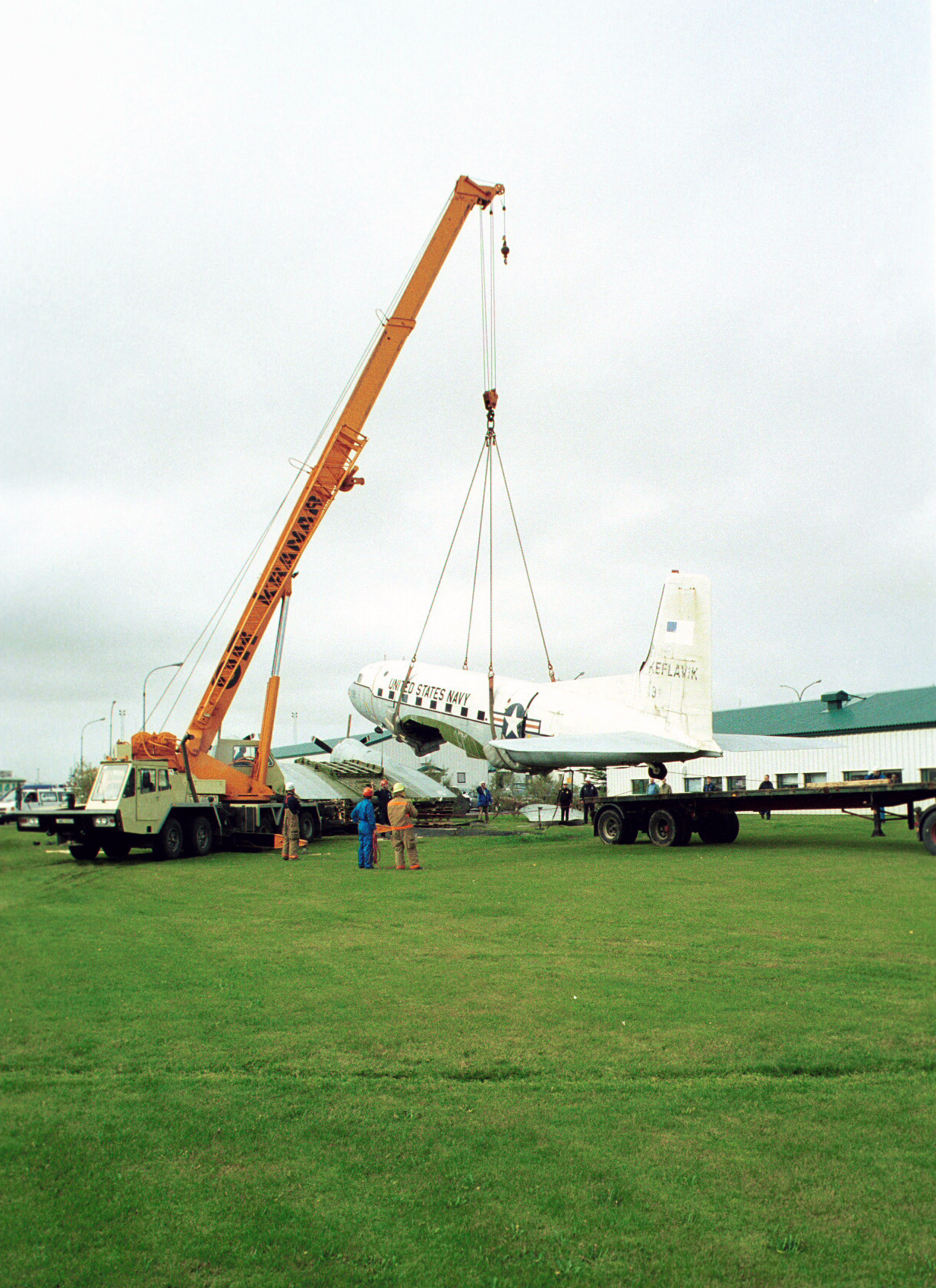
A C-117D being moved from NAS Keflavik to the Aviation Museum of Iceland.

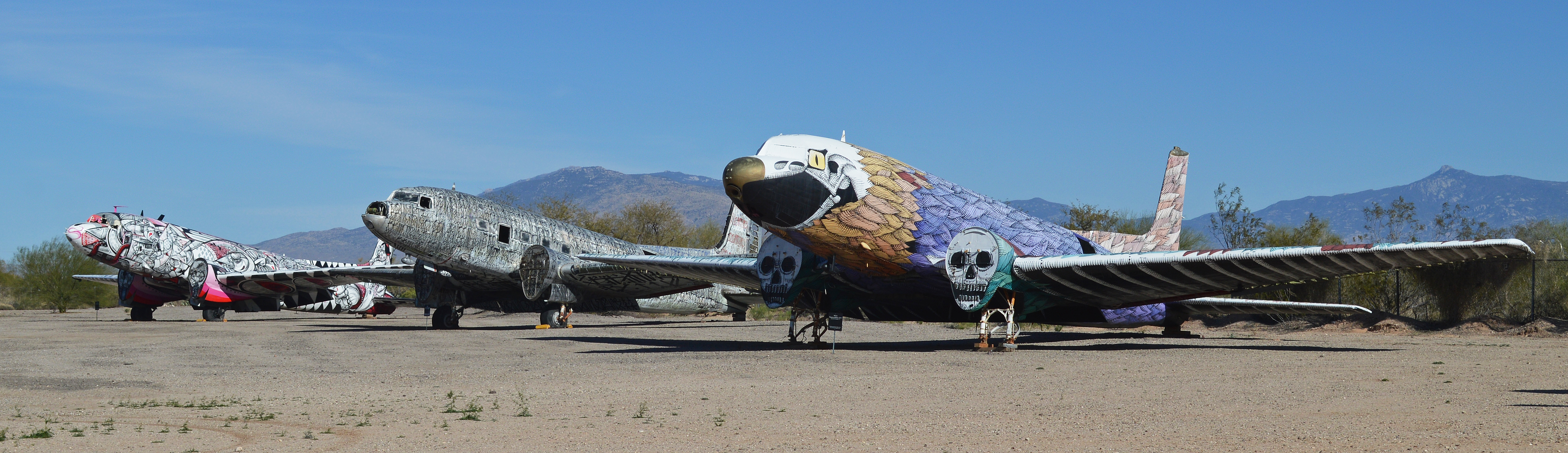
C-117s at the Pima Air & Space Museum.

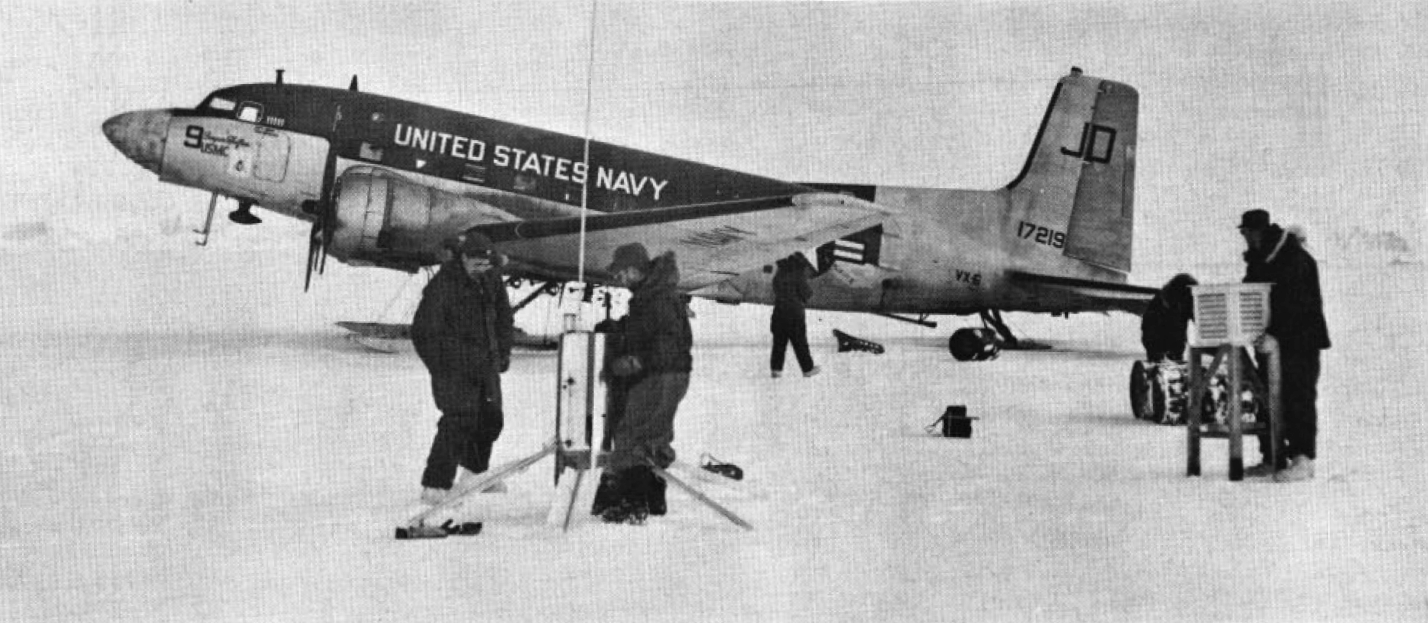
A LC-117D "Semper Shafters USMC" with ski landing gear and weather radar in the nose near the Beardmore Glacier, Antarctica, 1961.

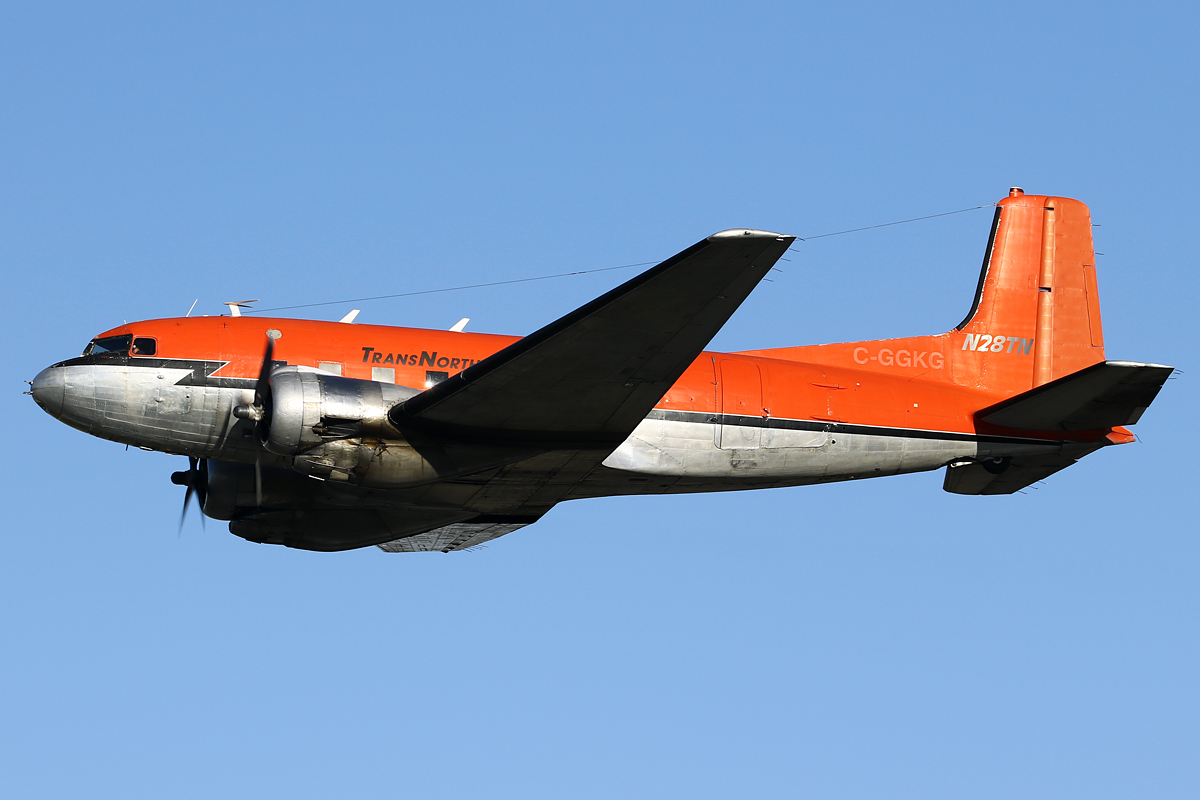
A Trans Northern Aviation Super DC-3.

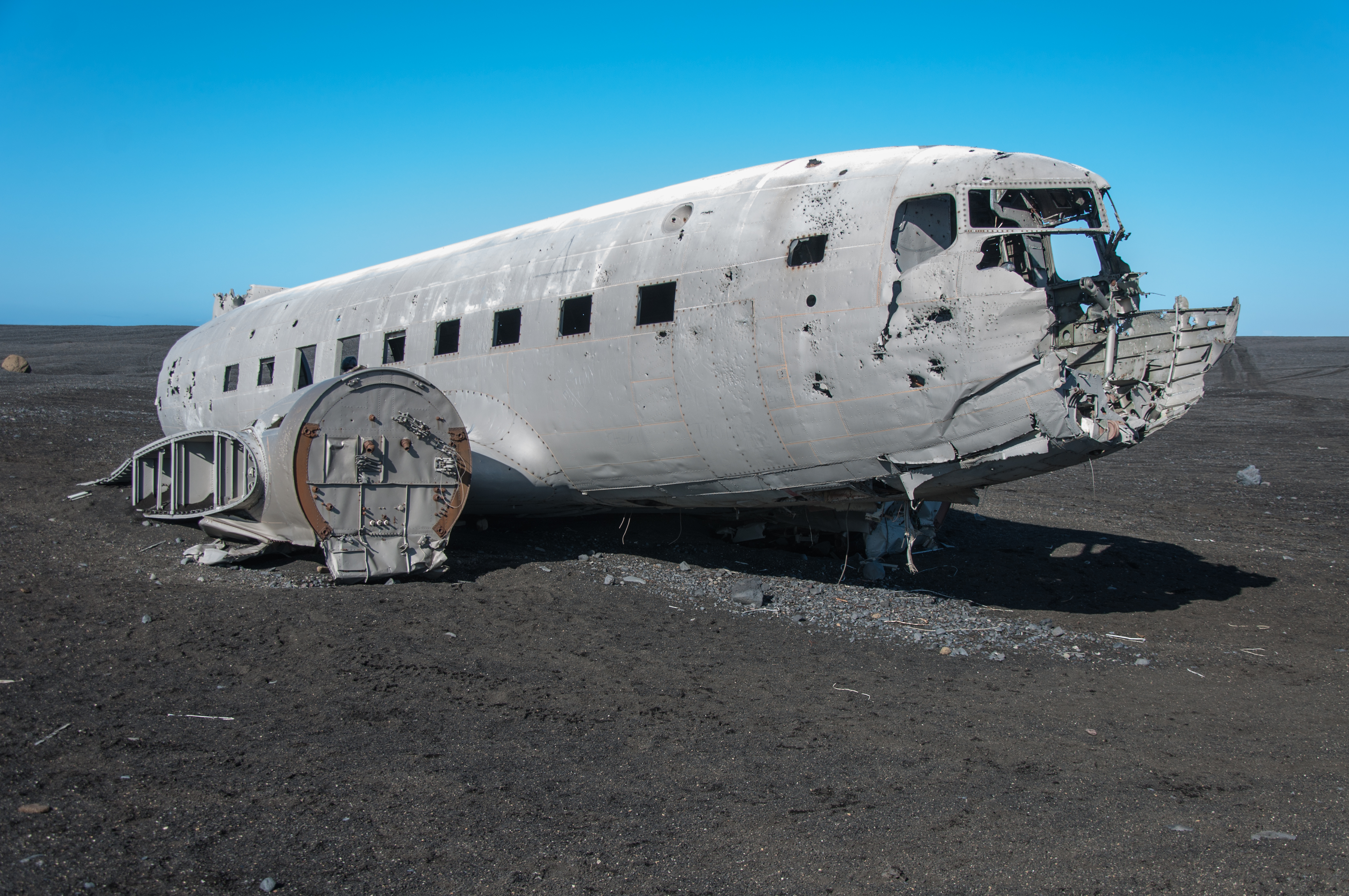
US Navy C-117D Sólheimasandur Iceland Crash.

== See also ==
Related development

- Basler BT-67
- Douglas AC-47 Spooky
- Douglas C-47 Skytrain
- Douglas DC-2
- Douglas DC-3
- Lisunov Li-2
- Showa/Nakajima L2D
- Conroy Turbo-Three
- Conroy Tri-Turbo-Three

Aircraft of comparable role, configuration, and era

- Curtiss C-46 Commando
- Douglas DC-5
- Saab 90 Scandia
- Vickers VC.1 Viking

Related lists

- List of aircraft of World War II
- List of civil aircraft

== Bibliography ==
- Davis, Larry. C-47 Skytrain in action. Carrollton: Squadron/Signal Publications, 1995. ISBN 0897473299.
- Francillon, René J. McDonnell Douglas Aircraft Since 1920. London: Putnam & Company, 1979. ISBN 0370000501.
- Herman, Arthur. Freedom's Forge: How American Business Produced Victory in World War II. New York: Random House, 2012. ISBN 978-1400069644.
- Parker, Dana T. Building Victory: Aircraft Manufacturing in the Los Angeles Area in World War II. Cypress, California: Dana Parker Enterprises, 2013. ISBN 978-0989790604.
