= Evans Ice Stream =

Glacier in Antarctica

- Location within Antarctica
- Type: ice stream
- Location: Ellsworth Land
- Coordinates: 76°00′S 78°00′W
- Thickness: unknown
- Terminus: Filchner-Ronne Ice Shelf
- Status: unknown

The Evans Ice Stream is a large ice stream draining from Ellsworth Land, between Cape Zumberge and Fowler Ice Rise, into the western part of the Ronne Ice Shelf. Mills Glacier flows adjacently into the ice stream from the southwest side. The feature was recorded on 5 February 1974 in Landsat imagery. It was named by the UK Antarctic Place-Names Committee for Stanley Evans, a British physicist who, starting in 1961, developed apparatus for radio echo sounding of icecaps and glaciers from aircraft; he carried out upper atmosphere research at Brunt Ice Shelf, 1956–57.

== See also ==
- List of glaciers in the Antarctic
- Glaciology
