= Carlson Inlet =

Carlson Inlet (78°0′S 78°30′W) is an ice-filled inlet, 100 miles (160 km) long and 25 miles (40 km) wide, lying between Fletcher Ice Rise and Fowler Ice Rise in the southwest part of the Ronne Ice Shelf. It was named by the Advisory Committee on Antarctic Names for Lieutenant Ronald F. Carlson, U.S. Navy, pilot of R4D-8 and C-130 aircraft with Squadron VX-6, who made innumerable flights in support of International Geophysical Year and United States Antarctic Research Program field parties in the 1950s and 1960s. On December 14, 1961, he commanded a C-130 Hercules flight from McMurdo Station across the Ellsworth Mountains, during which he observed, photographed and roughly sketched this inlet.
