= List of recorded icebergs by area =

This is a list of icebergs by total area.

In 1956, an iceberg in the Antarctic was reported to be an estimated 333 kilometres (207 mi) long and 100 kilometres (62 mi) wide. Recorded before the era of satellite photography, the 1956 iceberg's estimated dimensions are less reliable.

Iceberg	Maximum surface (km^{2})	Maximum length (km)	Maximum width (km)	Year recorded	Picture	Reference
B-15	11,007	295	37	2000	Iceberg B-15A drifting toward the Drygalski Ice Tongue prior to the collision, 2 January 2005 (NASA)	
A-38	6,900	144	48	1998	The split of the A38-B iceberg is recorded in this series of images. The iceberg was originally part of the massive A-38 iceberg, which broke from the Ronne Ice Shelf in Antarctica	
B-15A	6,400			2002	Northern edge of Iceberg B-15A in the Ross Sea, Antarctica, 29 January 2002	
A-68	5,800	175	50	2017	Calving crack in the Larsen C ice shelf	
C-19	5,500	200	32	2002	Iceberg C-19 breaking off from the Ross Ice Shelf, 11 May 2002, image:DMSP.	
B-9	5,390	154	35	1987	Iceberg B-9B colliding with the Mertz Glacier Tongue calving the Mertz iceberg, 20 February 2010	
A-76	4,320	170	25	2021	Calving and size compared to Mallorca	-
A23a	4,000	74	63	2021	Iceberg in November 2023	
D-28	1,636	62 approx	30 approx	2019	The D-28 iceberg breaking off, September 2019	
A-81	1,550			2023		
A-74	1,270	56	33	2021	A-74 soon after calving	
B-31	660	39	22	2013	B31 shown at the lower right.	
D-16	310	28	15	2006		
Petermann Ice Island (2010)	260			2010	Natural-colour satellite image of the ice island that calved off the glacier on August 5, 2010.	
B-44	256			2017	Radar imagery captured by the European Space Agency's Sentinel-1 on September 23, 2017, showed an early view of the new iceberg.	
B-17B	140			1999	NOAA satellite image of Iceberg B-17B, December 11, 2009.	
