= Iceberg B-9 =

Antarctic iceberg that calved in 1987

Coordinates: 66°36′0″S 142°36′0″E

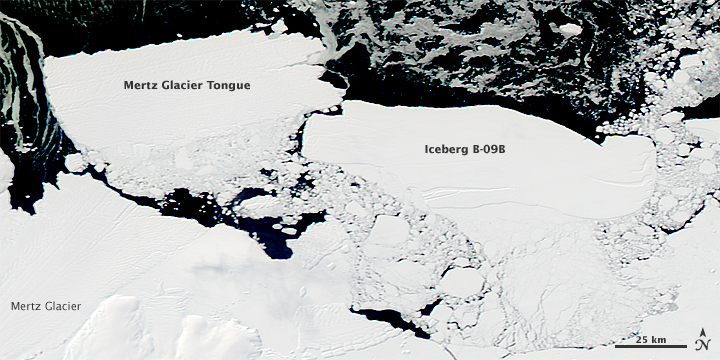
Iceberg B-9B colliding with the Mertz Glacier Tongue calving the Mertz iceberg, 20 February 2010

Iceberg B-9B as of 23 January 2025 (map data)

Iceberg B-9G as of 23 January 2025 (map data)

Iceberg B-9 was an iceberg that calved from Antarctica in 1987. It measured 154 kilometres (96 mi) long and 35 kilometres (22 mi) wide; it had a total area of 5,390 square kilometres (2,080 mi^{2}), and is one of the longest icebergs ever recorded. This calving took place immediately east of the future calving site of Iceberg B-15; it carried away Little America V which had been closed in December 1959. Starting in October 1987, Iceberg B-9 drifted for 22 months, covering 2,000 kilometres (1,200 mi) on its journey. Initially, B-9 moved northwest for seven months, before being drawn southward by a subsurface current that eventually led to its colliding with the Ross Ice Shelf in August 1988. It then made a 100-kilometre (62 mi) radius gyre before resuming its northwest drift. It moved at an average speed of 2.5 kilometres (1.6 mi) per day over the continental shelf, as measured by NOAA-10 and DMSP satellite positions, and by the ARGOS data buoy positions. In early August 1989, B-9 broke into three large pieces north of Cape Adare. These pieces were designated as B-9A, 56 by 35 kilometres (35 mi × 22 mi), B-9B, 100 by 35 kilometres (62 mi × 22 mi), and B-9C, 28 by 13 kilometres (17.4 mi × 8.1 mi).

B-9A drifted east and was located about 475 kilometres (295 mi) south of the South Orkney Islands in April 2002 where it triggered various ice warnings. In December 2003, it had made its way north and passed South Georgia Island to the east.

B-9B drifted toward the Mertz Glacier on the George V Coast, where it came to rest next to the glacier and remained there for eighteen years. On February 12 or 13th 2010, it collided with the giant floating Mertz Glacier tongue, and shaved off from it a new iceberg measuring 78 kilometres (48 mi) long and 39 kilometres (24 mi) wide. These then began drifting together about 100–150 kilometres (62–93 mi) off the eastern coast of Antarctica.

By December 2011, Iceberg B-9B had made its way into Commonwealth Bay and had broken up into three major pieces, parts of which froze to the seabed. The huge iceberg prevented three tourist ships from reaching Antarctica; they had been intended to mark the centenary of the polar voyage of Australian explorer Douglas Mawson who had landed at Cape Denison on January 8, 1912, and constructed a complex of huts, which remain standing. These ships attempted to reach the cape, but had to turn back, in light of unusually harsh conditions caused by B-9B's position in the bay. A spokeswoman from the Australian government's Antarctic division observed: "There [are] unusual ice conditions ... affecting all the tourist ships that are going down there[,] because the tourist ships don't have ice-breaking capabilities, and they also don't have choppers, so their ability to get anywhere near the Mawson's huts area is basically stopped." In 2011, Amy Coopes from the Agence France-Presse expected that Iceberg B-9B could remain in Commonwealth Bay for the next decade. In 2018, B-9B still remains in the Commonwealth Bay, surrounded by other tabular icebergs.

== See also ==
- List of recorded icebergs by area
