= Touchdown Hills =

Group of hills in Antarctica

Touchdown Hills (78°7′S 35°0′W) is a group of snow-covered hills extending south from Vahsel Bay on the east side of the Filchner Ice Shelf. So named by the Commonwealth Trans-Antarctic Expedition in 1957 because one of the expedition members, while piloting a plane fitted with skis, mistook these hills for clouds and hit them, bounding upwards undamaged.

== See also ==
- Grand Chasms
