= Filchner–Ronne Ice Shelf =

Ice shelf in Antarctica

Filchner-Ronne Ice Shelf in blue with other ice shelves

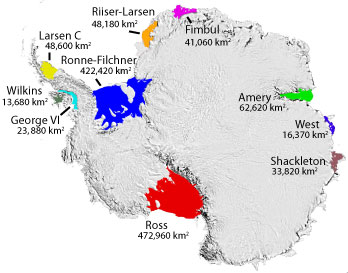
Some named Antarctic iceshelves.

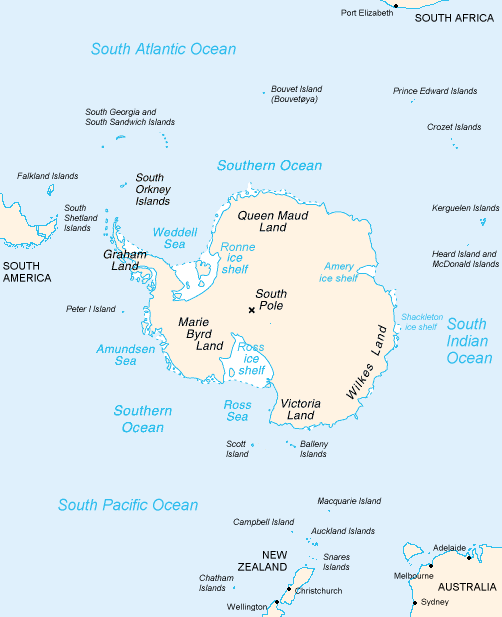
Location.

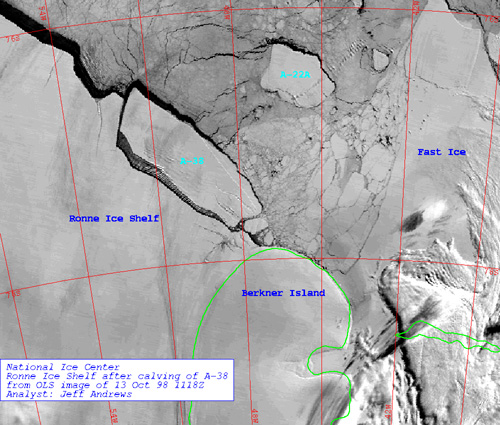
The calving of A-38 off Ronne Ice Shelf.

The A38-B iceberg splits.

Rapid sea ice breakup along the Ronne-Filchner Ice Shelf, January 2010

The Filchner–Ronne Ice Shelf or Ronne–Filchner Ice Shelf is an Antarctic ice shelf bordering the Weddell Sea.

== Description ==
The seaward side of the Filchner–Ronne Ice Shelf is divided into Eastern (Filchner) 79°00′S 40°00′W and the larger Western (Ronne) 78°30′S 61°00′W sections by Berkner Island. The whole ice shelf covers some 430,000 km^{2}, making it the second largest ice shelf in Antarctica (and on Earth), after the Ross Ice Shelf. It grows perpetually due to a flow of inland ice sheets. From time to time, when the shearing stresses exceed the strength of the ice, cracks form and large parts of the ice sheet separate from the ice shelf and float off and disperse as icebergs. This is known as calving.

The Ronne Ice Shelf is the larger and western part of the Filchner–Ronne Ice Shelf. It is bounded on the west by the base of the Antarctic Peninsula (Graham Land with Zumberge Coast and Orville Coast) and Ellsworth Land. Commander Finn Ronne, USNR, leader of the Ronne Antarctic Research Expedition (RARE) in 1947–48, discovered and photographed a strip along the entire northern portion of this ice shelf in two aircraft flights in November and December 1947. He named it the "Lassiter Shelf Ice" and gave the name "Edith Ronne Land" to the land presumed to lie south of it. In 1957–58, the US-IGY party at Ellsworth Station, under now Captain Ronne, determined that the ice shelf was larger than previously charted, that it extends southward to preempt most of "Edith Ronne Land". Inasmuch as Capt. James Lassiter's name has been assigned to a coast of Palmer Land, the Advisory Committee on Antarctic Names (US-ACAN) approved the name Ronne Ice Shelf for this large ice shelf, on the basis of first sighting and exploration of the ice shelf by Ronne and parties under his leadership. The shelf is therefore named for Edith Ronne, the wife of Finn Ronne and RARE Expedition member.

The Filchner Ice Shelf is the eastern part of the Filchner–Ronne Ice Shelf. It is bounded on the west by Berkner Island and on the east by Coats Land. The east part of this shelf was discovered in January–February 1912 by the German Antarctic Expedition under Wilhelm Filchner. Filchner named the feature for Kaiser Wilhelm, but the Emperor requested it be named for its discoverer. The shelf is nourished primarily by the Slessor Glacier, the Recovery Glacier, and the Support Force Glacier, all located east of Berkner Island.

In 2021, sponges and other unidentified suspension feeders were reported to have been found growing on a boulder under the western margin of the Filchner Ice Shelf, close to Berkner Island, at a depth of 1,233 m (872 of which were ice), 260 km from open water.

== Disintegration (calving) ==
In October 1998, the iceberg A-38 broke off the Filchner–Ronne Ice Shelf. It had an extent of roughly 150 by 50 km and was thus larger than Delaware. It later broke up again into three parts. A similar-sized calving in May 2000 created an iceberg 167 by 32 km in extent, dubbed A-43 – the disintegration of this is thought to have been responsible for the November 2006 sighting of several large icebergs from the coast of the South Island of New Zealand, the first time since 1931 that any icebergs had been observed from the New Zealand mainland. A large group of small icebergs (the largest some 1000 metres in length) was seen off the south-east coast of the island, with one of them drifting close enough to shore to be visible from the hills above the city of Dunedin. If these were indeed the remnants of this calving, then over the course of five and a half years they had travelled slowly north and also east over about half the globe, a journey of some 13,500 km.

From January 12 and January 13, 2010, an area of sea ice larger than the state of Rhode Island, or one-seventh the size of Wales, broke away from the Ronne–Filchner Ice Shelf and shattered into many smaller pieces. The Moderate-Resolution Imaging Spectroradiometer (MODIS) on NASA's Aqua and Terra satellites captured this event in this series of photo-like images.

In May 2021, Iceberg A-76 broke off the northwest corner of the shelf. At 4320 km^{2}, it is larger than Mallorca, several times larger than Iceberg A-74 which calved in the same year, or approximately 14% the size of Belgium.

The ice of the Filchner–Ronne ice shelf can be as thick as 600 m; the water below is about 1400 m deep at the deepest point.

The international Filchner–Ronne Ice Shelf Programme (FRISP) was initiated in 1973 to study the ice shelf.

A study published in Nature in 2012 by scientists from the Alfred Wegener Institute for Polar and Marine Research in Germany, and funded by the Ice2Sea initiative, predicts the disappearance of the 450,000 km^{2} (170,000 sq mi) vast ice shelf in Antarctica by the end of the century which could – indirectly – add up to 4.4 mm (0.17 in) of rise of sea level each year.

== See also ==
- Belgrano I Base
- Ellsworth Station
- Filchner Trough
- Grand Chasms
- Weddell Gyre
