= Iceberg A-81 =

Iceberg

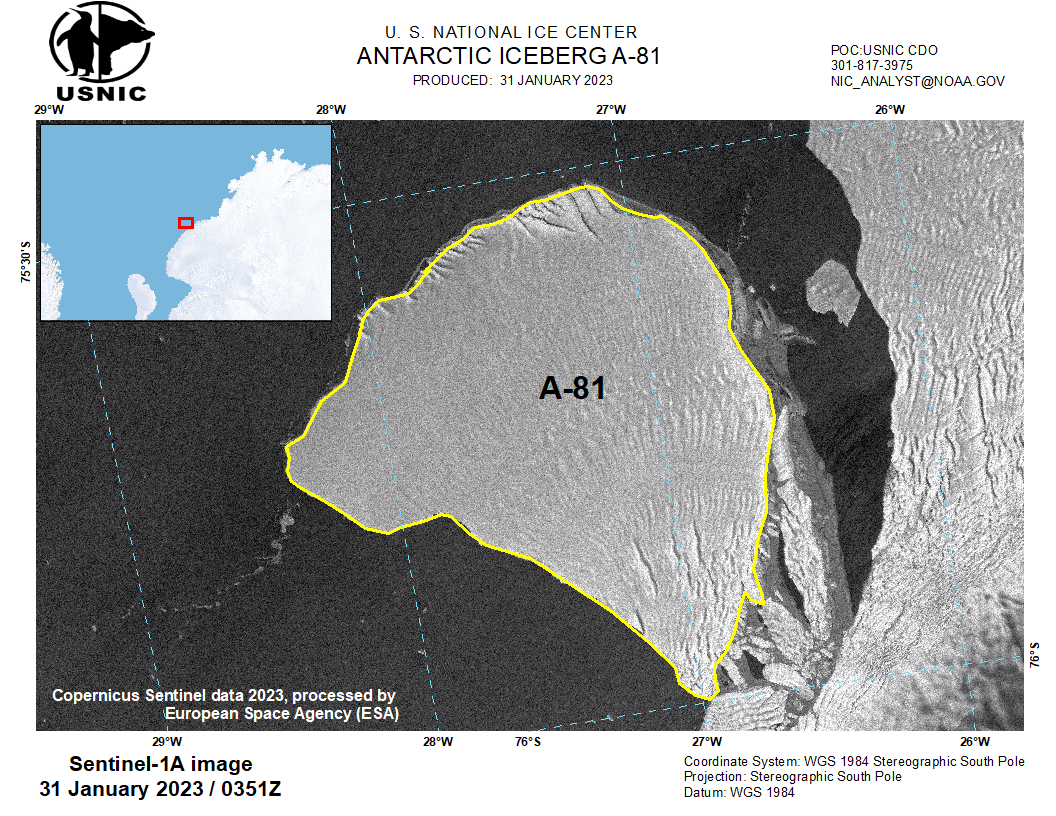
Satellite image of the iceberg (USNIC)

Iceberg A-81 on 23 January 2025 (map data)

Iceberg A-81 is an iceberg that calved from the Brunt Ice Shelf in January 2023. The detachment happened near the British-operated Halley Research Station, which is located only 20 km away from the point of rupture. The iceberg is estimated to measure 1,550 square kilometres (600 sq mi).

The iceberg was first spotted on 22 January by the British Antarctic Survey and was later confirmed by the U.S. National Ice Center (USNIC) using satellite imagery.

As of 31 March 2023, the iceberg was located at 76°48' South and 33°41' West and had a length of 28 nautical miles and width of 25 nautical miles.
