= International Ice Charting Working Group =

International research association

The International Ice Charting Working Group (IICWG) was formed in October 1999 to promote cooperation between the world's ice centers on all matters concerning sea ice and icebergs.

== Member Organizations ==
- Canadian Ice Service
- Danish Meteorological Institute
- Finnish Ice Service
- Federal Maritime and Hydrographic Agency of Germany
- Icelandic Meteorological Office
- Hydrographical Department, Maritime Safety Agency, Japan
- Norwegian Meteorological Institute
- Russian Federation Arctic and Antarctic Research Institute
- Swedish Meteorological and Hydrological Institute
- United States National Ice Center
- U.S. Coast Guard International Ice Patrol – North Atlantic Iceberg Detection and Forecasting
