= Iceberg B-15 =

Largest recorded iceberg by area

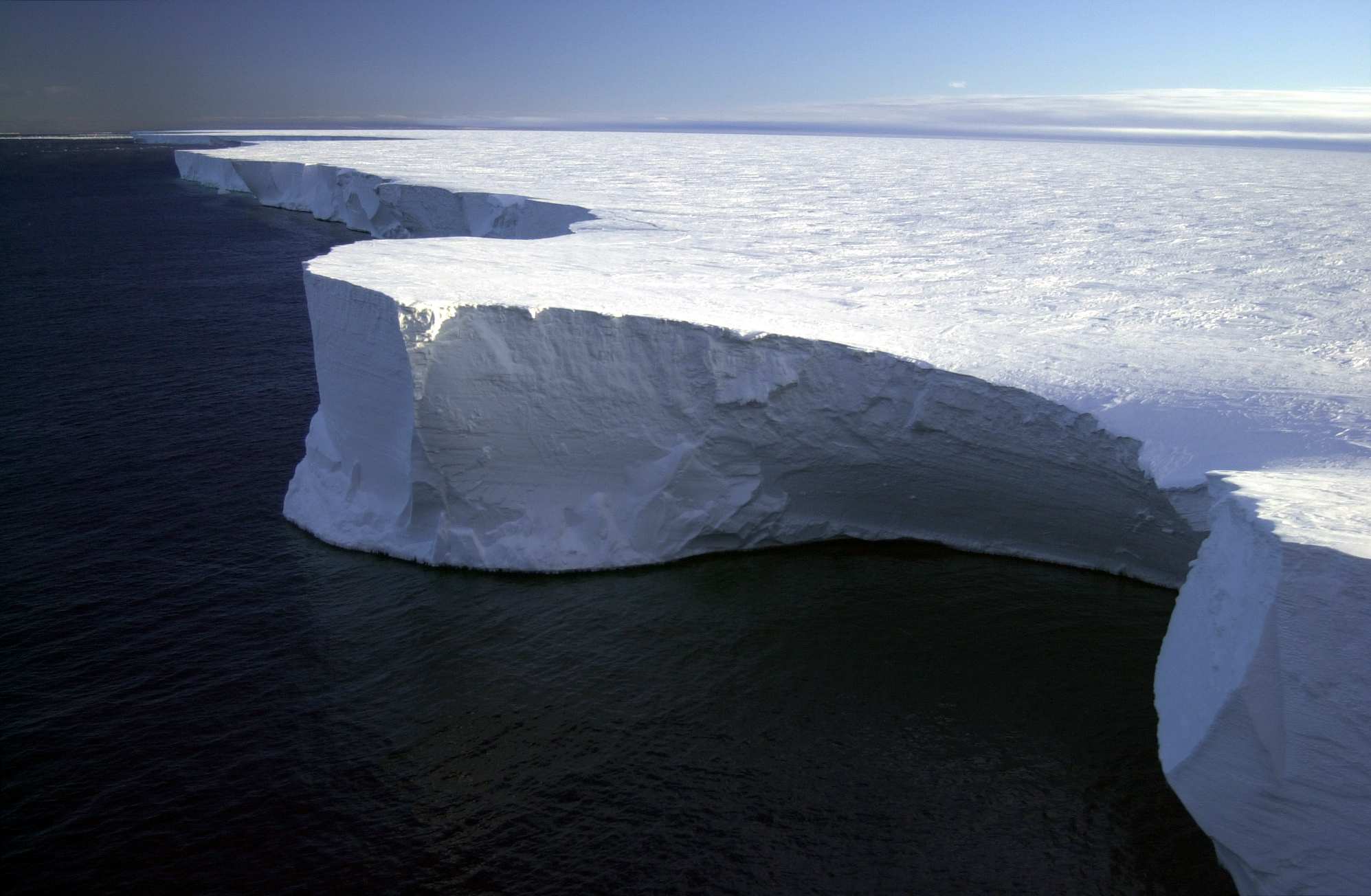
Northern edge of Iceberg B-15A in the Ross Sea, Antarctica, 29 January 2001

Iceberg B-15 was the largest recorded iceberg by area. (Note: Iceberg B-15 is the largest iceberg recorded by satellite photography. In 1956, an iceberg in the Antarctic was reported to measure an estimated 333 km × 100 km (180 nmi × 54 nmi). Recorded before the era of satellite photography, the 1956 iceberg's estimated dimensions are less reliable.) It measured around 295 by 37 kilometres (159 by 20 nautical miles), with a surface area of 11,000 square kilometres (3,200 square nautical miles), about the size of the island of Jamaica. Calved from the Ross Ice Shelf of Antarctica in March 2000, Iceberg B-15 broke up into smaller icebergs, the largest of which was named Iceberg B-15A. In 2003, B-15A drifted away from Ross Island into the Ross Sea and headed north, eventually breaking up into several smaller icebergs in October 2005. In 2018, a large piece of the original iceberg was steadily moving northward, located between the Falkland Islands and the island of South Georgia. As of August 2023, the U.S. National Ice Center (USNIC) still listed one extant piece of B-15 that meets the minimum threshold for tracking (70 km^{2} or 20 sq nmi). This iceberg, B-15AB, measured 20 km × 7 km (11 nmi × 4 nmi); it was, as of 2021, grounded off the coast of Antarctica in the western sector of the Amery region.

== History ==
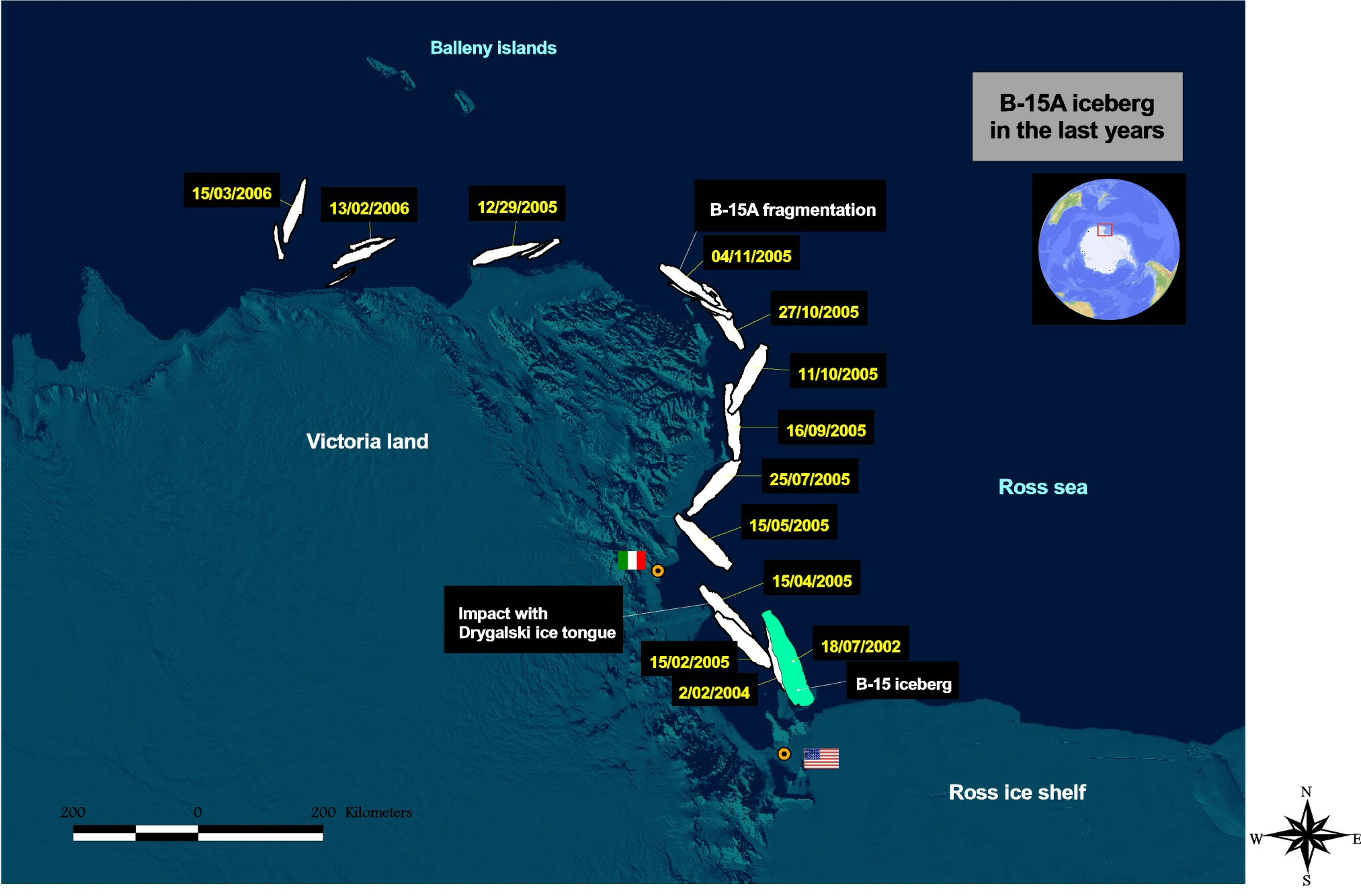
Iceberg B-15A's four-year journey, July 2002 to March 2006

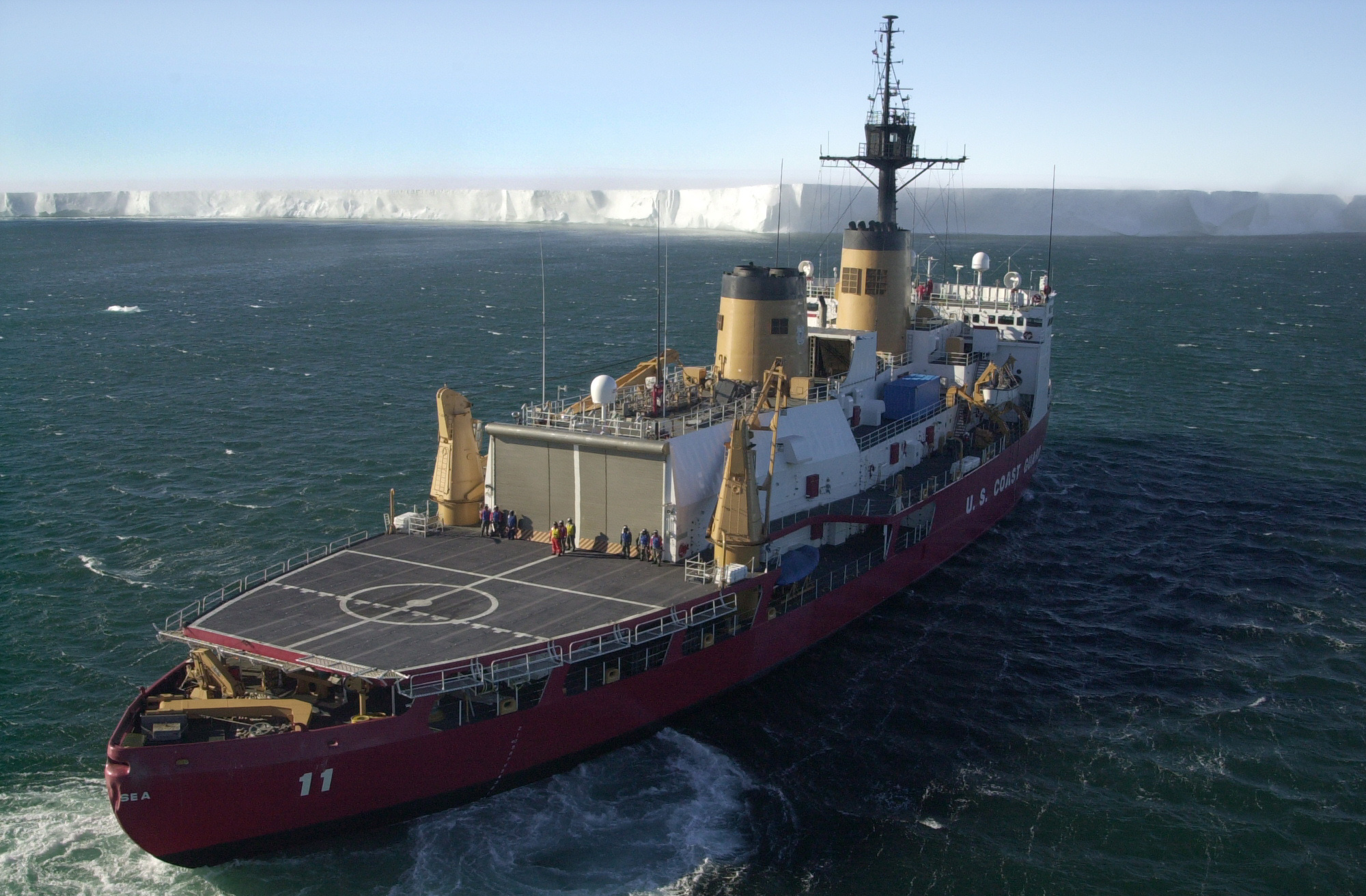
USCGC Polar Sea nears Iceberg B-15A in January 2001

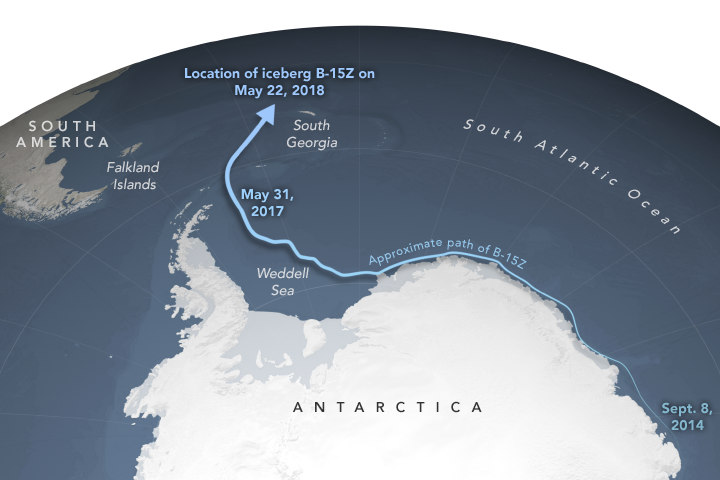
Iceberg B-15Z route 2014-2018

Iceberg B-15AB as of 23 January 2025 (map data)

In the last weeks of March 2000, Iceberg B-15 calved from the Ross Ice Shelf near Roosevelt Island, Antarctica. The calving occurred along pre-existing cracks in the ice shelf. The iceberg measured around 295 km × 37 km (159 nmi × 20 nmi), with a surface area of 10,915 km^{2} (3,182 sq nmi). Scientists believe that the enormous piece of ice broke away as part of a long-term natural cycle, which occurs every fifty to one hundred years. In 2000, 2002, and 2003, Iceberg B-15 broke up into several pieces, the largest of which, B-15A, covered 6,400 km^{2} (1,900 sq nmi) of the sea surface.

In November 2003, after a separation created a new iceberg designated B-15J, B-15A drifted away from Ross Island on the open waters of the Ross Sea. In December 2003, a relatively-small knife-shaped iceberg, B-15K (about 300 km^{2}), detached itself from the main body of B-15A and started drifting northward. By January 2005, prevailing currents caused B-15A to drift toward the Drygalski Ice Tongue, a 70-kilometre-long (40 nmi) extension of the land-based David Glacier, which flows through the coastal mountains of Victoria Land. A few kilometres from the ice tongue, the iceberg became stranded on a seamount that created an area of shallow water, before resuming its northward course after the portion in contact with the seabed disintegrated. On 10 April 2005, B-15A collided with the ice tongue, breaking off its tip; the iceberg seemed unaffected by the collision.

Iceberg B-15A continued to drift along the coast, leaving McMurdo Sound. On 27–28 October 2005, the iceberg ran aground off Cape Adare in Victoria Land, generating seismic signals that were detected as far away as the Amundsen-Scott South Pole Station and broke into several smaller pieces, the largest of which was still named B-15A (now measuring approximately 1,700 km^{2} or 500 sq nmi). Three additional pieces were named B-15M, B-15N, and B-15P. Iceberg B-15A then moved farther north into the southern Pacific Ocean south of New Zealand and broke up into more pieces. These were spotted on 3 November 2006, by the crew of a Lockheed P-3 Orion of the Royal New Zealand Air Force on a fisheries patrol flight; the crew said they saw at least 100 pieces. On 21 November 2006 several large pieces were seen just 60 km (30 nmi) off the coast of Timaru, New Zealand—the largest measured about 1.8 km (1 nmi), rising 37 m (120 ft) from the surface of the ocean.

As of 2018, four pieces remained that were large enough (at least 70 km^{2} or 20 sq nmi) to be tracked by the National Ice Center. One piece, B-15Z, measured 19 km × 9 km (10 nmi × 5 nmi). It was located in the southern Atlantic Ocean, about 280 km (150 nmi) northwest of the island of South Georgia. As it continued its move northward, the speed of melt increased; most icebergs do not last long that far north.

By 2020, only two pieces remained large enough to track. B-15aa – a direct remnant of B-15z – was drifting to the east of South Georgia, in the south Atlantic Ocean. B-15ab remained among sea ice along the coast of Antarctica south of Africa. In 2021, B-15ab became the last fragment to remain on the US National Ice Center list of tracked icebergs, still grounded off the coast of Antarctica.

== Effects on Antarctic ecology ==
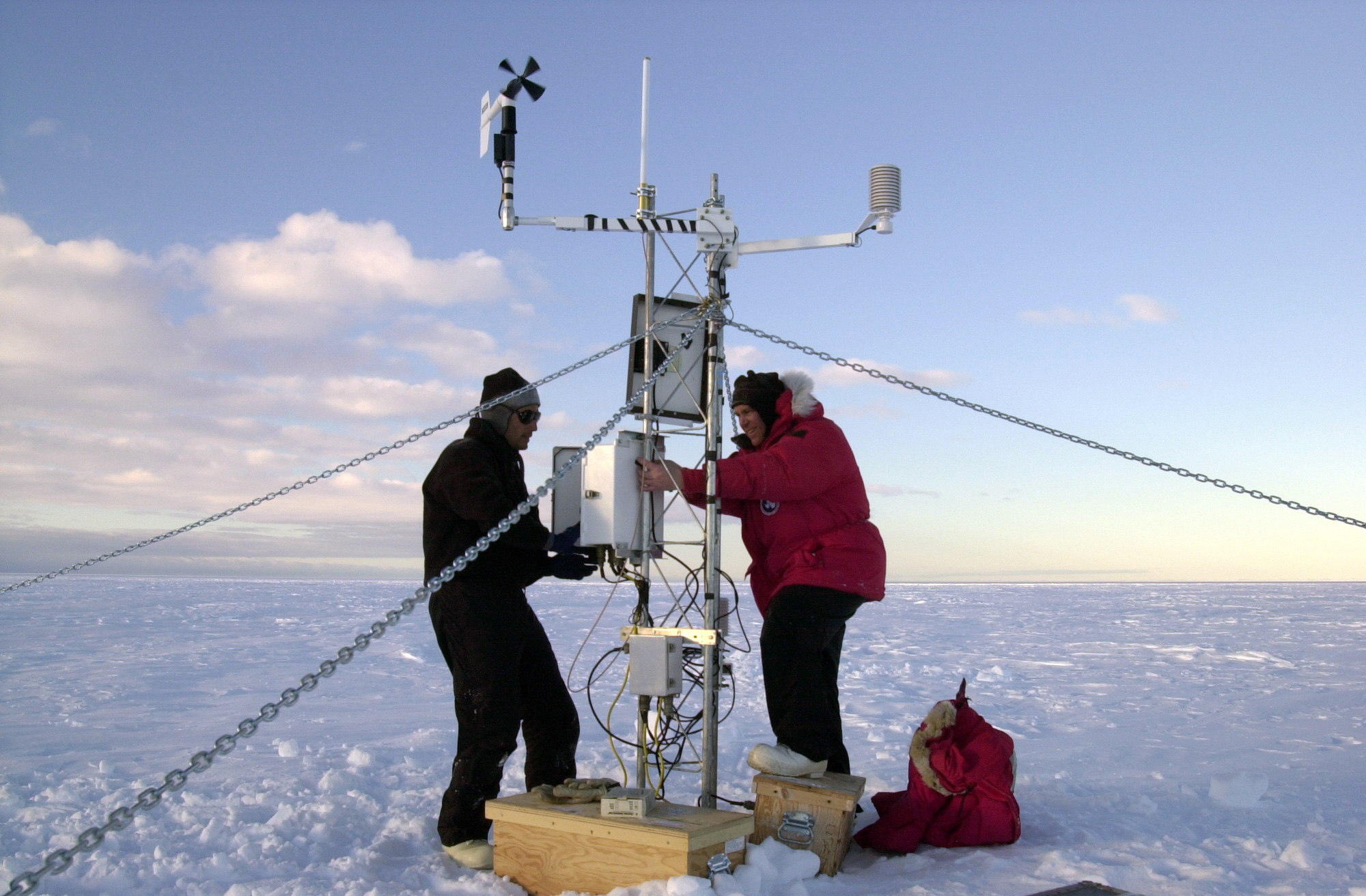
Researchers installing weather and GPS instruments on Iceberg B-15A, 29 January 2001

On 29 January 2001, researchers from the University of Chicago and the University of Wisconsin installed weather and Global Positioning System instruments on Iceberg B-15A. It was the first time an iceberg had been monitored in this way. The data gathered led to an unprecedented understanding of how giant icebergs make their way through the waters of Antarctica and beyond.

Iceberg B-15A collided with Drygalski Ice Tongue on 10 April 2005, breaking off an eight-square-kilometre (2 1/4 sq nmi) section of the ice tongue. Antarctic maps needed to be redrawn.

B-15A prevented ocean currents and winds from assisting in the 2004–2005 summer break-up of the sea ice in McMurdo Sound, and was an obstacle to the annual resupply ships to three research stations. The floe was expected to cause a catastrophic decline in the population of Adélie penguins, as it considerably increased the distances which parent penguins must travel back from the sea to their chicks. Weddell seals and skuas are also inhabitants of McMurdo Sound and their populations may have been affected as well.

On 21 October 2005 a large storm in the Gulf of Alaska generated a trans-Pacific Ocean swell that may have contributed to breaking B-15A into many pieces on 27 October 2005. The swell travelled 13,500 km (7,300 nmi) from Alaska to Antarctica over six days. Scientists studied this event as an example of how weather in one area can have effects in other parts of the world, and with concern over the effects on global warming.

A more detailed study in 2010, however, showed that the iceberg breakup was principally caused by repeated groundings on the near-coastal seabed off Cape Adare, Victoria Land.

== Satellite images ==
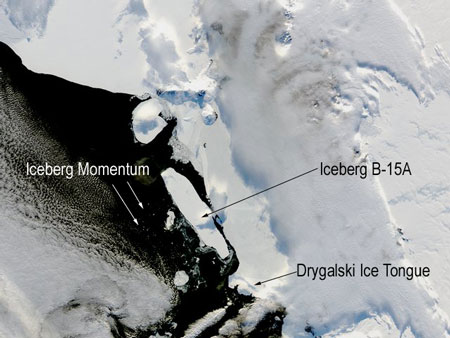
Iceberg B-15A drifting toward the Drygalski Ice Tongue before the collision, 2 January 2005 (NASA)

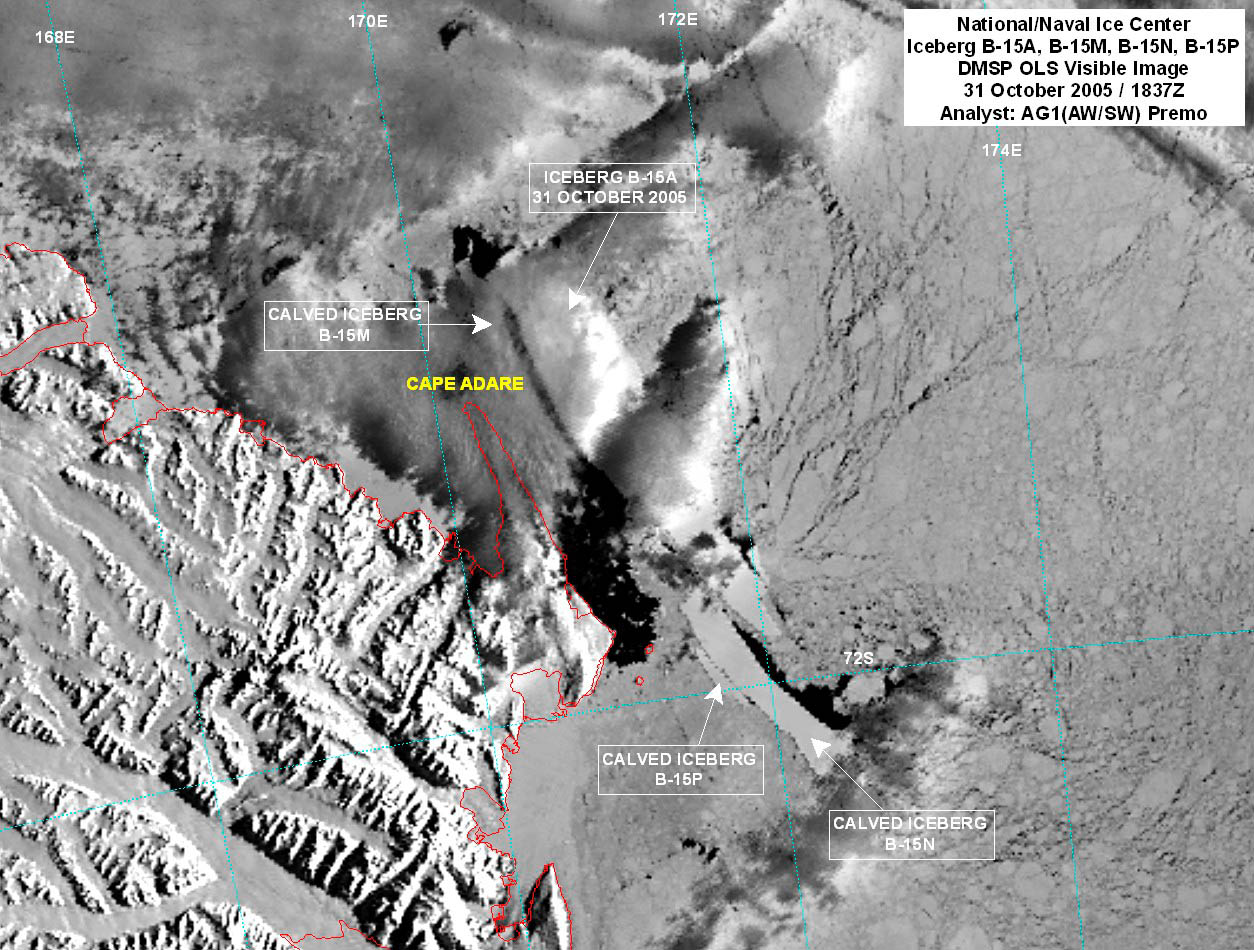
Iceberg B-15 after break-up, showing B-15M, B-15N, and B-15P, 31 October 2005 (DMSP)

== See also ==
- Encounters at the End of the World, a Werner Herzog documentary which contains some footage of B-15
