= Iceberg A-76 =

2021 Antarctica breakaway iceberg

Calving of A-76 and size comparison with the island Mallorca

Iceberg A-76 was a large iceberg which briefly held the title for the world's largest floating iceberg. It calved from the Filchner–Ronne Ice Shelf in Antarctica.

A-76, effectively a piece of floating ice shelf, detached from the western side of the ice shelf. It floated through the Weddell Sea and by 2023 had reached the South Atlantic near South Georgia, carried by currents and winds. The iceberg was about 170 km (110 mi) long and 25 km (16 mi) wide, and is described as being shaped like a "giant ironing board", and roughly the size of the English county of Cornwall. The size at calving was an estimated 4,320 km^{2} (1,670 sq mi).

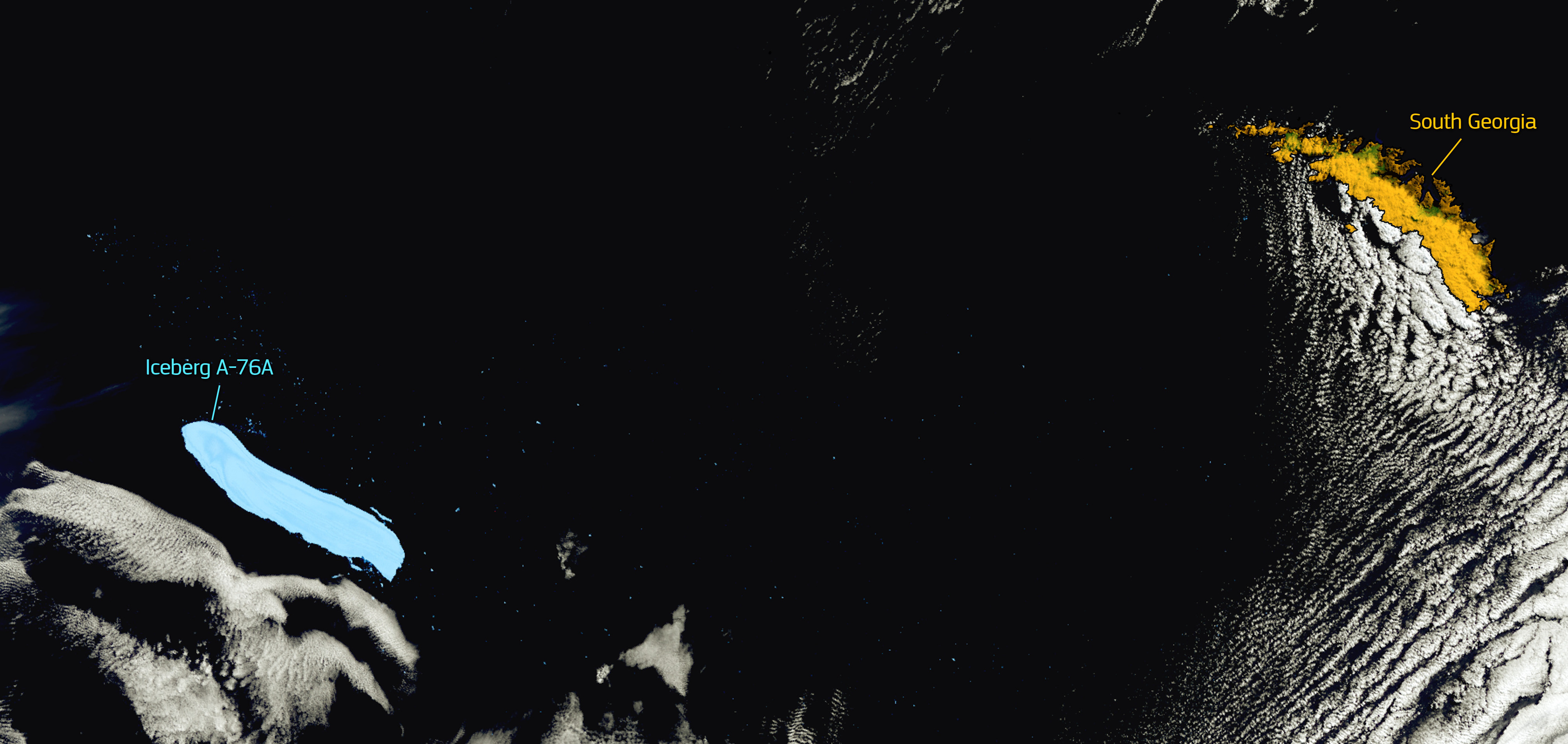
Iceberg A-76a in March 2023

It was first spotted by Keith Makinson, a polar oceanographer with the British Antarctic Survey in May 2021.

A-76c on 23 January 2025 (map data)

By day 148, the iceberg consisted of three fragments, A-76a, A-76b, and A-76c.
