= Grand Chasms =

The Grand Chasms (78°35′S 39°30′W) are two or more deep crevasses in the Filchner Ice Shelf, Antarctica, extending west for an unknown distance from 37°W, close west of the Touchdown Hills. The feature is the most notable crevassed area on the Filchner Ice Shelf, roughly 60 miles (100 km) long and from 0.25 to 3 miles (0.4 to 4.8 km) wide. It was discovered by the Commonwealth Trans-Antarctic Expedition, 1955–58. During 1957 it was examined by a U.S. party from Ellsworth Station led by Edward Thiel, who applied the descriptive name.
