= Filchner Trough =

Undersea trough

The Filchner Trough (77°S 36°W) is an undersea trough extending north from its associated feature, the Filchner Ice Shelf. The name, proposed by Heinrich Hinze of the Alfred Wegener Institute for Polar and Marine Research, Bremerhaven, Germany, was approved by the Advisory Committee for Undersea Features in June 1997.
