= Iceberg D-16 =

Antarctic iceberg calved from the Fimbul Ice Shelf in 2006

Iceberg D-16 is a city-sized iceberg near Antarctica, discovered on March 26, 2006, by the National Ice Center using satellite imagery from the Defense Meteorological Satellite Program. It broke free of the Fimbul Ice Shelf, located along the northwestern section of Queen Maud Land in the eastern Weddell Sea.

It is approximately 8 miles wide and 15 miles long (120 square miles), roughly the size of a city.

== See also ==
- List of recorded icebergs by area
