= Iceberg B-17B =

Antarctic iceberg that calved off the Ross Ice Shelf in 1999

- Iceberg
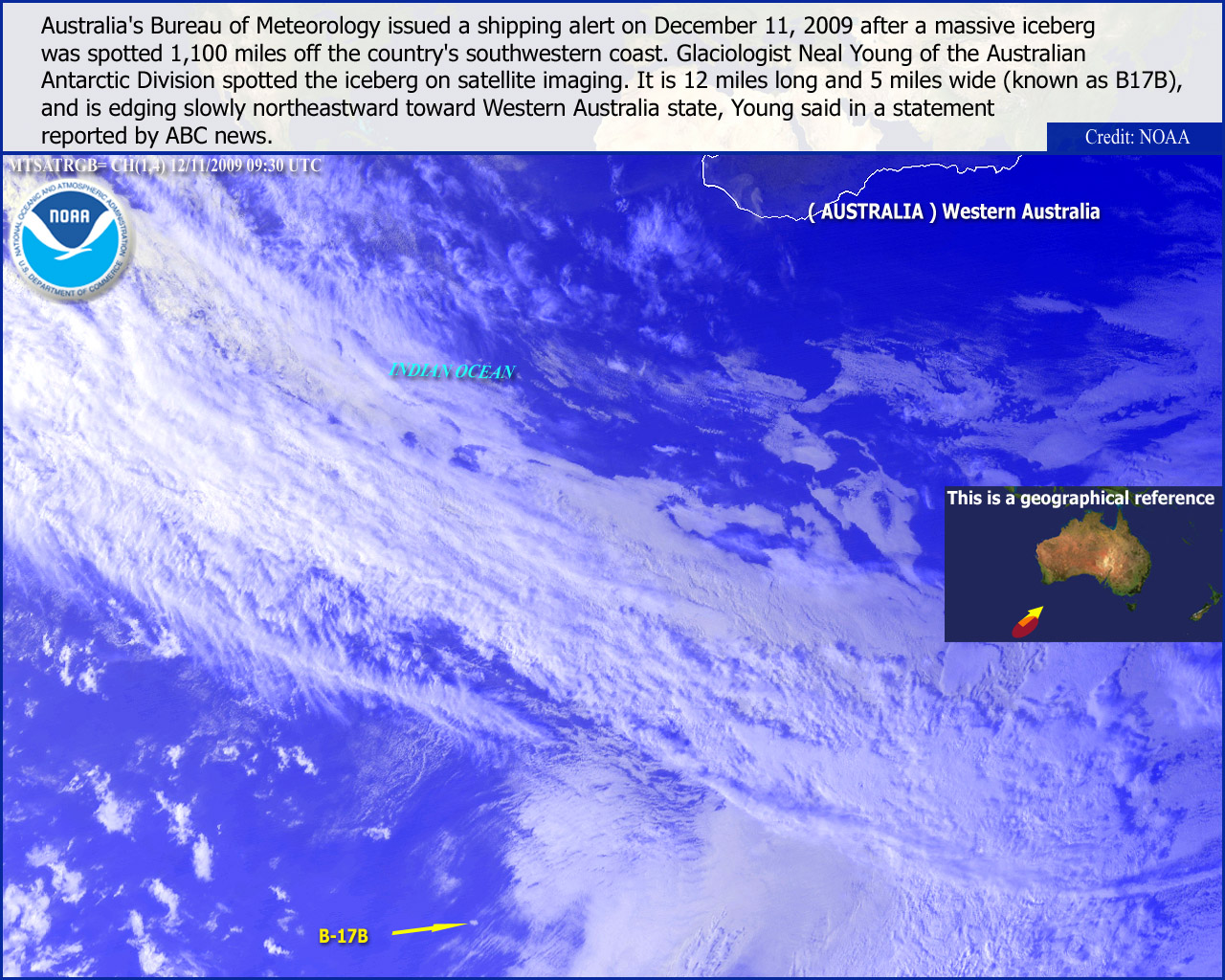
- NOAA satellite image of Iceberg B-17B, December 11, 2009.

- Location within Oceania
- Coordinates: 48°47′59″S 107°30′02″E
- Part of: Ross Ice Shelf (originally)
- Water bodies: Southern Ocean

Area
  - Total: 140 km^{2} (54 mi^{2}) (at break)

Iceberg B-17B was an iceberg twice the size of Manhattan that floated in the Southern Ocean approximately 1,700 kilometres (1,100 mi) off the coast of Western Australia. Iceberg B-17B measured approximately 140 square kilometres (54 mi^{2}). B-17B originated in the first half of 2000 when the iceberg B17 split into two parts. B17 itself had broken off from the Ross Ice Shelf two months before.

In mid-December 2009 the Australian Bureau of Meteorology issued a warning to users of shipping lanes in the area. By the 31st of that month the main body of the iceberg had broken into three pieces.

== See also ==
- List of recorded icebergs by area
