= Polar ice pack =

Polar ice pack may refer to:

- Arctic ice pack
- Antarctic sea ice
- Drift ice
