= Iceberg A-74 =

Iceberg that calved from the north side of the Antarctic Brunt Ice Shelf

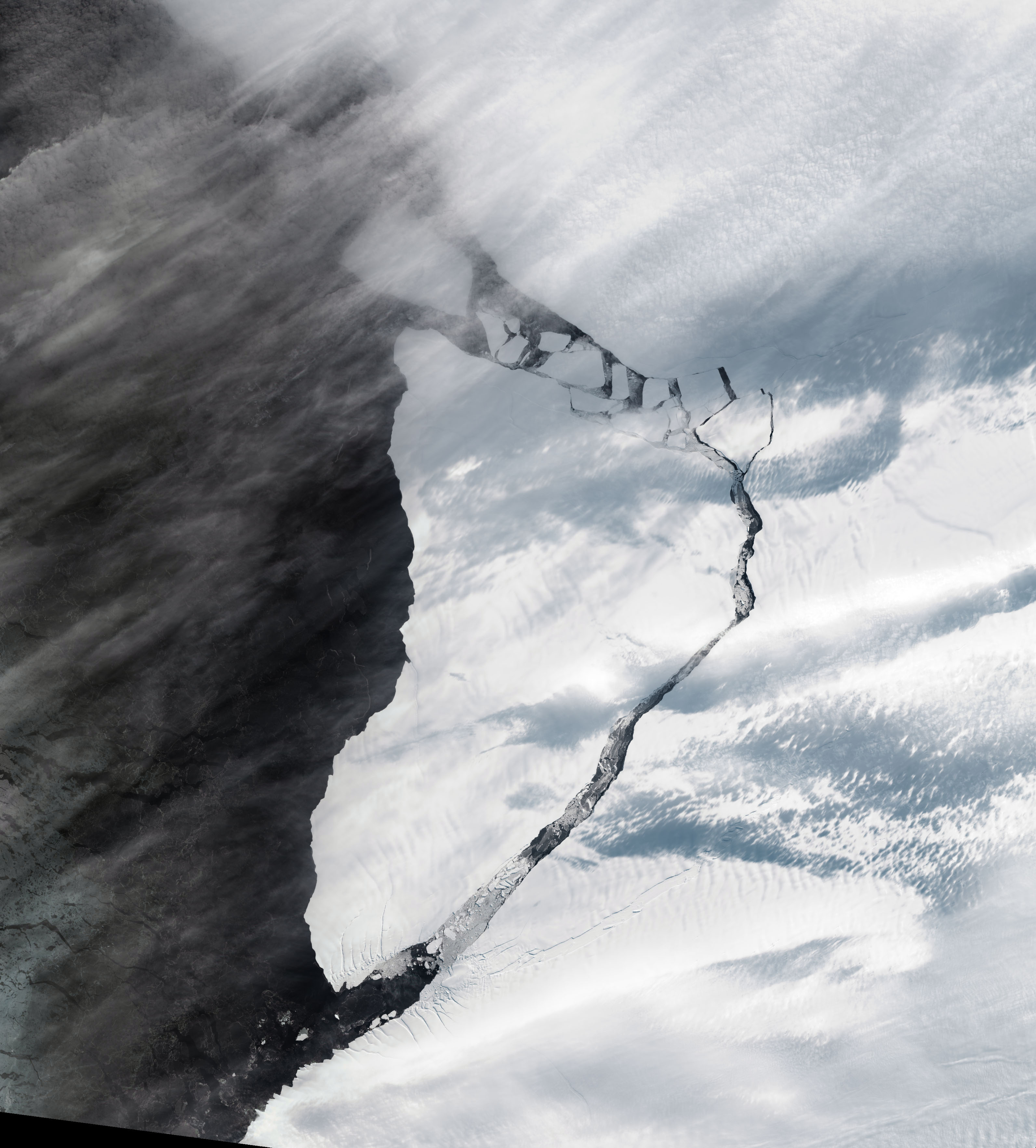
Iceberg A-74 pictured by Landsat 8 on 1 March 2021

iceberg movement August 2021

Iceberg A-74a on 23 January 2025 (map data)

Iceberg A-74 is an iceberg that calved from the north side of the Antarctic Brunt Ice Shelf in February 2021. Its calving had been anticipated due to large ice rifts that opened up in September 2019 and spread in the Antarctic summer of 2020–21. The iceberg measured 1,270 square kilometres (490 mi^{2}) soon after calving. It has moved away from the Antarctic coast which allowed, on 13–14 March 2021, the research vessel Polarstern to complete a circumnavigation as part of a research expedition. The Polarstern has photographed the sea bed which has provided an insight into fauna that can survive up to 30 kilometres (19 mi) from the nearest daylight.

== Calving ==
The calving of the iceberg was much anticipated due to large rifts in the ice that appeared in September 2019, in the vicinity of the McDonald Ice Rumples. The rift spread very rapidly across part of the Brunt Ice Shelf in summer 2020–21.

GPS equipment belonging to the British Antarctic Survey (BAS) first reported that the iceberg had calved on 26 February. The GPS receivers are maintained by researchers at the nearby BAS Halley Research Station. The GPS units had been raised above the snow in January and February 2021 as part of regular maintenance. Two of the units were on the iceberg when it calved and reported moving around 100 metres (110 yd) between 8:00 am and 9:00 am GMT on 26 February. Previous movements had been around 8 metres (8.7 yd) per day.

The calving was confirmed by the U.S. National Ice Center (USNIC) the following day, using imagery from the Sentinel-1A satellite. The USNIC named the iceberg A-74 in accordance with its naming conventions.

Its initial location, post-calving, was 75°13′S 25°41′W. Soon after calving iceberg A-74 measured 30 nautical miles (56 km) by 18 nautical miles (33 km) and had a surface area of around 1,270 square kilometres (490 mi^{2}). It was considered large for an iceberg originating from Brunt, being the largest to calve in this sector since 1971. The Eastern Weddell Sea region is less affected by global warming than the Western portion. The calving of A-74 is part of the natural ice cycle and not attributed to global warming. On 1 March the cloud cover thinned sufficiently to allow NASA to capture a natural colour image of the iceberg using the Operational Land Imager aboard Landsat 8.

== Potential course ==
The calving of A-74 may affect other rifts at Brunt including the "Halloween Crack" and "Chasm-1", features that may lead to further calving events and possibly threaten the Halley Research Station. If A-74 bumps into the ice shelf it may cause a further calving as the western portion is only attached by around 2 kilometres (1.2 mi) of ice between the end of Chasm 1 and the McDonald Ice Rumples. A-74 is expected to be captured by the Weddell Gyre and follow a similar path to Iceberg A-68.

On 10 June 2022, the USNIC announced that A-74 had calved into A-74A and A-74B. At that time, A-74 had drifted 90 nautical miles (170 km; 100 mi) westward from the Brunt Ice Shelf since March 2021. A-74A was located at 76°55′S 45°54′W and measured 28 by 18 nautical miles (52 by 33 km) at maximum, as of 7 June 2022.

== Polarstern expedition ==
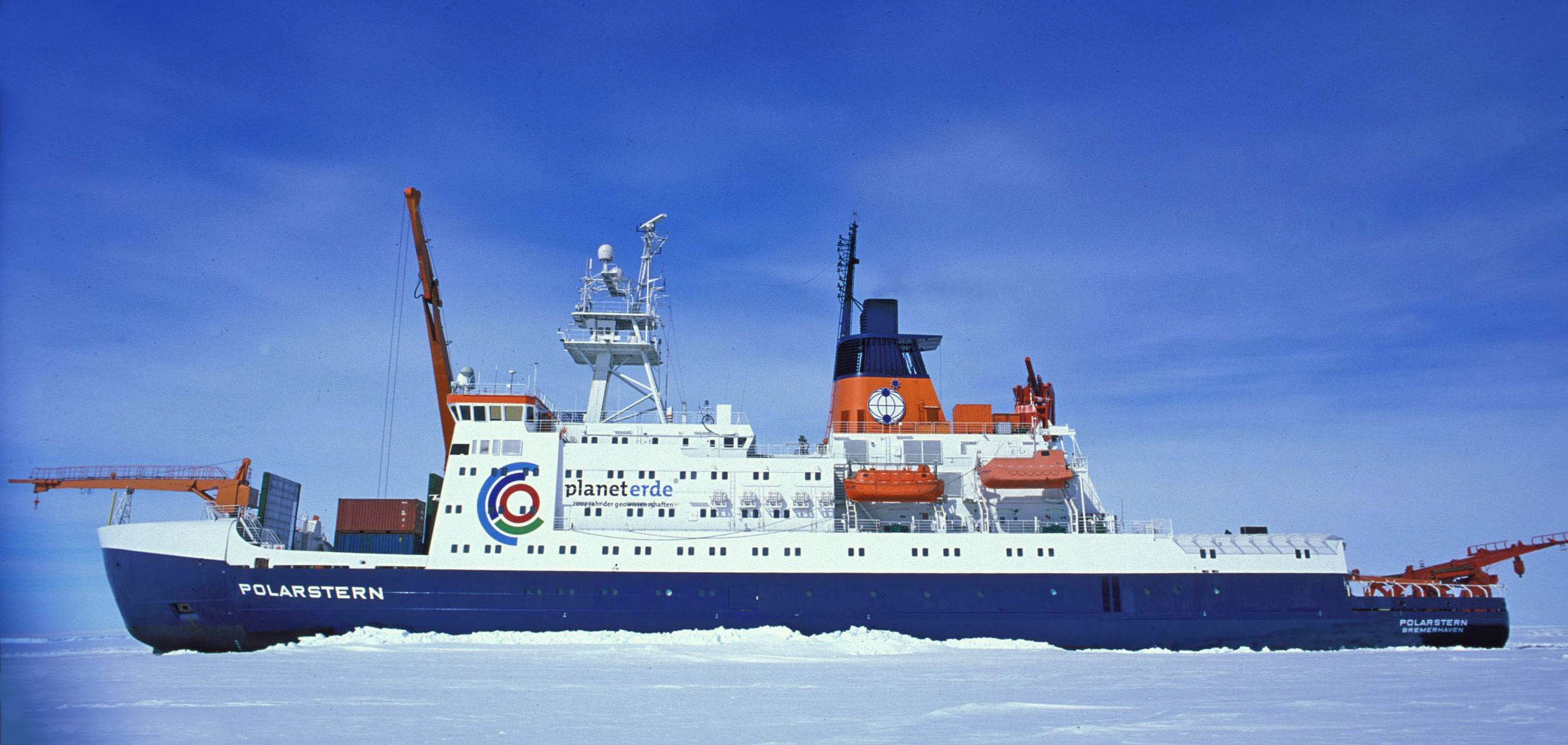
The Polarstern

On the weekend of 13–14 March 2021 the German Alfred Wegener Institute for Polar and Marine Research vessel Polarstern completed a circumnavigation of the iceberg. It had been positioned nearby on an unrelated research expedition when the iceberg calved and was diverted to carry out an investigation. In places the channel between A-74 and the remainder of the Brunt Ice Shelf was less than 500 metres (550 yd) wide. As the iceberg moves offshore parts of the seabed and water column are being exposed to sunlight, wind and temperature changes for the first time in 50 years. The movement of A-74 provides an opportunity for scientists to study the seafloor and organisms that are remote from light and food sources. Polarstern gathered more than 1,000 seafloor images and long videos of the seafloor in a five-hour operation. A large number of largely filter-feeding, sessile animals were discovered as well as some mobile fauna including five species of fish, two of octopus and a number of sea cucumbers, brittle stars and molluscs. The study shows that a good supply of food, carried by ocean currents, can reach areas located even 30 kilometres (19 mi) from the nearest daylight. It is hoped that the Polarstern can return to study the seafloor at regular intervals to document changes to the ecosystem caused by the calving.
