= Iceberg B-31 =

Antarctic iceberg calved from the Pine Island Glacier in 2013

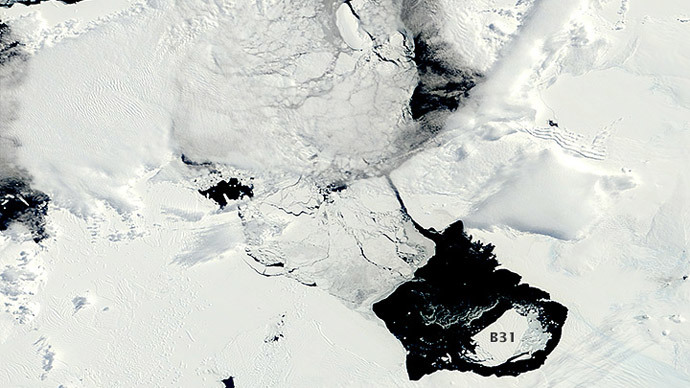
- B31 shown at the lower right.

Geography
- Highest elevation: 500 m (1600 ft)

Administration
- Antarctica

Iceberg B-31 is a large iceberg that formed in November 2013, when it separated from the Pine Island Glacier. B-31 is heading into the Antarctic Ocean, which may have possible repercussions for international shipping. Soon it would not be possible to track the iceberg as the winter darkness completely hides it. The ice island is 20 miles by 12 miles and 500 m of height. It was first observed by Moderate Resolution Imaging Spectroradiometer (MODIS), an instrument on NASA's Terra and Aqua satellites of NASA.
