= U.S. National Ice Center =

Echelon V command of the U.S. Navy

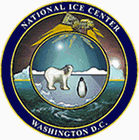
- Seal of the National Ice Center.
- Established: 1995 (31 years ago)
- Country: United States
- Coordinates: 38°51′06″N 76°56′12″W
- Parent organisations: National Oceanic and Atmospheric Administration, United States Navy, United States Coast Guard

The U.S. National Ice Center (USNIC) is a tri-agency operational center and echelon V command of the Fleet Weather Center - Norfolk (FWC-N), whose mission is to provide worldwide navigational ice analyses for the armed forces of the United States, allied nations, and U.S. government agencies.

It is represented by the United States Navy (Department of Defense); the National Oceanic and Atmospheric Administration (Department of Commerce); and the United States Coast Guard (Department of Homeland Security). The U.S. National Ice Center is a subordinate command of the Fleet Weather Center - Norfolk (FWC-N). Originally known as the Navy/NOAA Joint Ice Center, which was established on December 15, 1976 in a memorandum of agreement between the U.S. Navy and NOAA, the National Ice Center was formed in 1995 when the U.S. Coast Guard became a partner. The U.S. National Ice Center produces global sea ice charts and various cryospheric GIS products. They also name and track Antarctic icebergs if greater than 10 nautical miles (20 km) on its longest axis.

Icebergs must be a minimum of 19 kilometers in length to be tracked by the USNIC.

== See also ==
- International Ice Charting Working Group
- International Ice Patrol
