= Ice calving =

Breaking of ice chunks from the edge of a glacier

A mass of ice calves from the Perito Moreno glacier in Lago Argentino

Ice calving, also known as glacier calving or iceberg calving, is the breaking of ice chunks from the edge of a glacier. It is a form of ice ablation or ice disruption. It is the sudden release and breaking away of a mass of ice from a glacier, iceberg, ice front, ice shelf, or crevasse. The ice that breaks away can be classified as an iceberg, but may also be a growler, bergy bit, or a crevasse wall breakaway.

Calving of glaciers is often accompanied by a loud cracking or booming sound before blocks of ice up to 60 metres (200 ft) high break loose and crash into the water. The entry of the ice into the water causes large, and often hazardous waves. The waves formed in locations like Johns Hopkins Glacier can be so large that boats cannot approach closer than three kilometres (1 1/2 nautical miles). These events have become major tourist attractions in locations such as Alaska.

Many glaciers terminate at oceans or freshwater lakes which results naturally with the calving of large numbers of icebergs. Calving of Greenland's glaciers produces 12,000 to 15,000 icebergs each year alone.

Calving of ice shelves is often preceded by a rift. An ice shelf in steady state calves at roughly the same rate as the influx of new ice, and calving events may occur on sub-annual to decadal timescales to maintain an overall average mean position of the ice shelf front. When calving rates exceed the influx of new ice, ice front retreat occurs, and ice shelves may grow smaller and weaker.

== Causes ==
Video of iceberg calving in Greenland, 2007

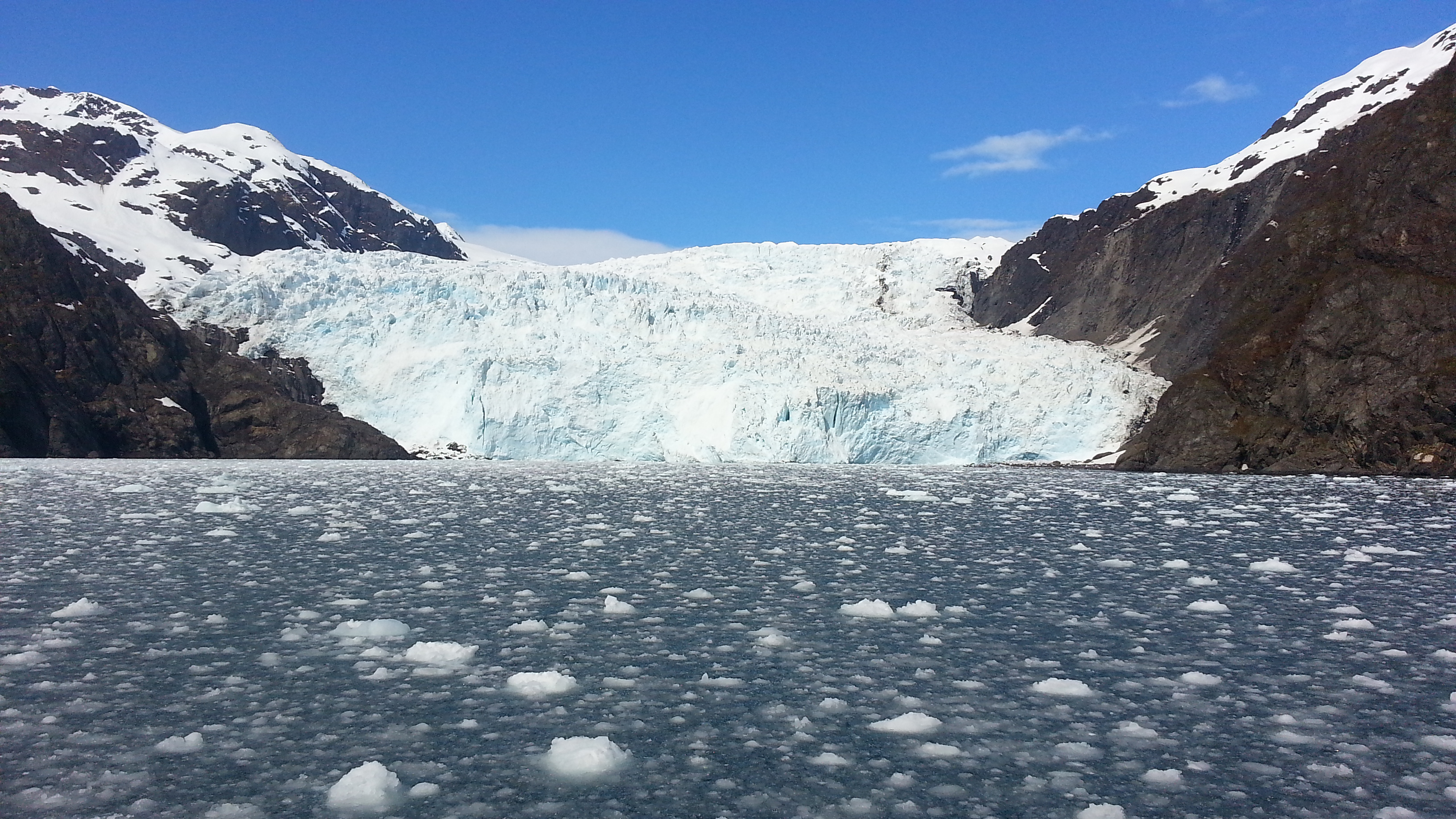
A calving glacier and the resulting ice field

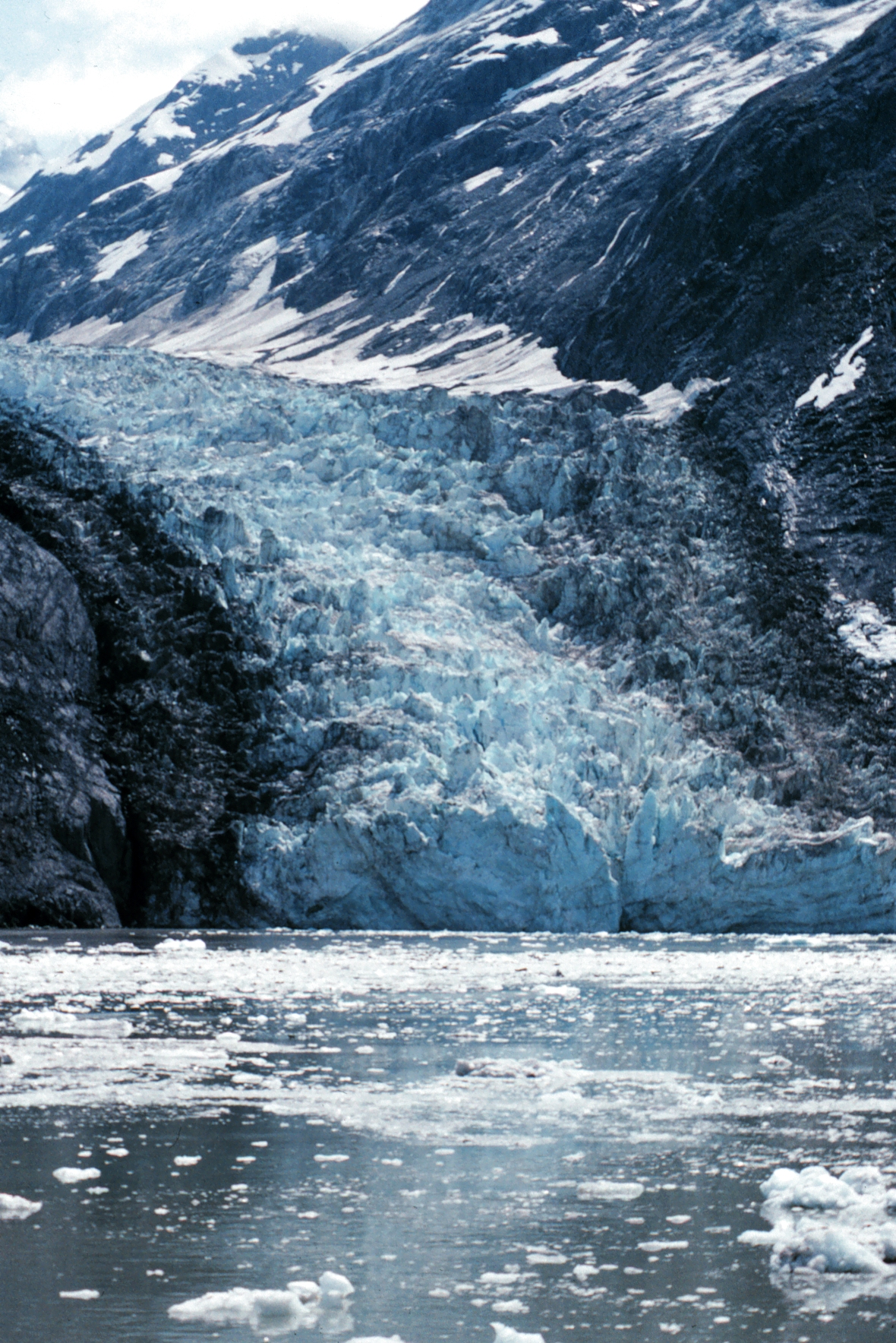
Glacier Bay, glacier calving

It is useful to classify causes of calving into first, second, and third order processes. First order processes are responsible for the overall rate of calving at the glacier scale. The first order cause of calving is longitudinal stretching, which controls the formation of crevasses. When crevasses penetrate the full thickness of the ice, calving will occur. Longitudinal stretching is controlled by friction at the base and edges of the glacier, glacier geometry and water pressure at the bed. These factors, therefore, exert the primary control on calving rate.

Second and third order calving processes can be considered to be superimposed on the first order process above, and control the occurrence of individual calving events, rather than the overall rate. Melting at the waterline is an important second order calving process as it undercuts the subaerial ice, leading to collapse. Other second order processes include tidal and seismic events, buoyant forces and melt water wedging.

When calving occurs due to waterline melting, only the subaerial part of the glacier will calve, leaving a submerged 'foot'. Thus, a third order process is defined, whereby upward buoyant forces cause this ice foot to break off and emerge at the surface. This process is extremely dangerous, as it has been known to occur, without warning, up to 300 m (980 ft) from the glacier terminus.

== Calving law ==
Though many factors that contribute to calving have been identified, a reliable predictive mathematical formula is still under development. Data is currently being assembled from ice shelves in Antarctica and Greenland to help establish a 'calving law'. Variables used in models include properties of the ice such as thickness, density, temperature, c-axis fabric, and impurity loading. A property known as 'ice front normal spreading stress' may be of key importance, despite it not normally being measured.

There are currently several concepts upon which to base a predictive law. One theory states that the calving rate is primarily a function of the ratio of tensile stress to vertical compressive stress, i.e., the calving rate is a function of the ratio of the largest to smallest principle stress. Another theory, based on preliminary research, shows that the calving rate increases as a power of the spreading rate near the calving front.

== Major calving events ==
=== Filchner-Ronne Ice Shelf ===
In October, 1988, the A-38 iceberg broke away from the Filchner-Ronne Ice Shelf. It was about 150 km x 50 km. A second calving occurred in May 2000 and created an iceberg 167 km x 32 km.

=== Amery Ice Shelf ===
A major calving event occurred in 1962 to 1963, resulting in an iceberg approximately 10,000 sq km in size. In the 1990's scientists identified an exceptionally large rift forming a section at the front of the shelf. Expecting a calving event was imminent, the section was informally named the 'loose tooth". After over 2 decades of anticipation and study, the "tooth" finally calved on Sept. 26, 2019, forming a 1,636 sq km (632 sq mi), 315 billion tonne iceberg known as D-28

=== Ward Hunt Ice Shelf ===
The largest observed calving of an ice island happened at Ward Hunt Ice Shelf. Sometime between August 1961 and April 1962 almost 600 km^{2} (230 sq mi) of ice broke away.

=== Ayles Ice Shelf ===
In 2005, nearly the entire shelf calved from the northern edge of Ellesmere Island. Since 1900, about 90% of Ellesmere Island's ice shelves have calved and floated away. This event was the biggest of its kind for at least the past 25 years. A total of 87.1 km^{2} (33 5/8 sq mi) of ice was lost in this event. The largest piece was 66.4 km^{2} (25 5/8 sq mi) in area, which is slightly larger than the City of Manhattan.

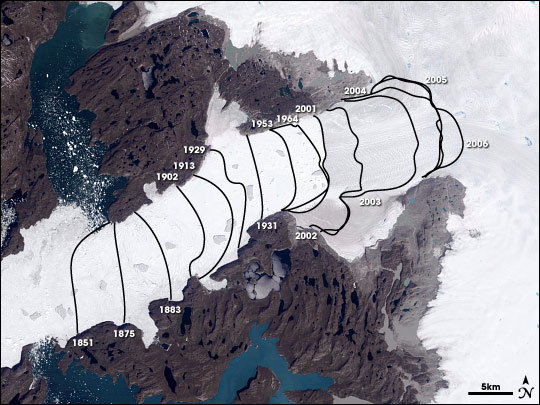
Landsat image of Jacobshavn Isbræ. The lines show the position of the calving front of the Jakobshavn Isbræ since 1851. The date of this image is 2001, and the calving front of the glacier can be seen at the 2001 line. The area stretching from the calving front to the sea (towards the bottom left corner) is the Ilulissat icefjord. Courtesy of NASA Space Observatory.

=== Larsen Ice Shelf ===
This large ice shelf, located in the Weddell Sea, extending along the east coast of Antarctic Peninsula, consists of three segments, two of which have calved. In January 1995, the Larsen A Ice Shelf containing 3,250 km^{2} (1,250 sq mi) of ice 200 m (660 ft) thick calved and disintegrated. Then the Larsen B Ice Shelf calved and disintegrated in February 2002.

=== Jacobshavn Isbræ Glacier ===
Also known as the Ilulissat Glacier or Sermeq Kujalleq in western Greenland, in an ongoing event, 35 billion tonnes of icebergs calve off and pass out of the fjord every year.

Photographer James Balog and his team were examining this glacier in 2008 when their cameras caught a piece of glacier the size of Lower Manhattan fall into the ocean. The calving event lasted for 75 minutes, during which time the glacier retreated a full mile across a calving face three miles (five kilometers) wide. Adam LeWinter and Jeff Orlowski captured this footage, which is featured in the film Chasing Ice.

== Glacier surfing ==
First conceived in 1995 by Ryan Casey while filming for IMAX, this sport involves a surfer being towed into range by a jet ski and waiting for a mass of ice to calve from a glacier. Surfers can wait for several hours in the icy water for an event. When a glacier calves, the mass of ice can produce 8 metres (26 ft) waves. Rides of 300 metres (980 ft) lasting for one minute can be achieved.

== See also ==
- Ablation
- Ice sheet dynamics
- Serac
