= Ice rise =

Clearly defined elevation of an ice shelf

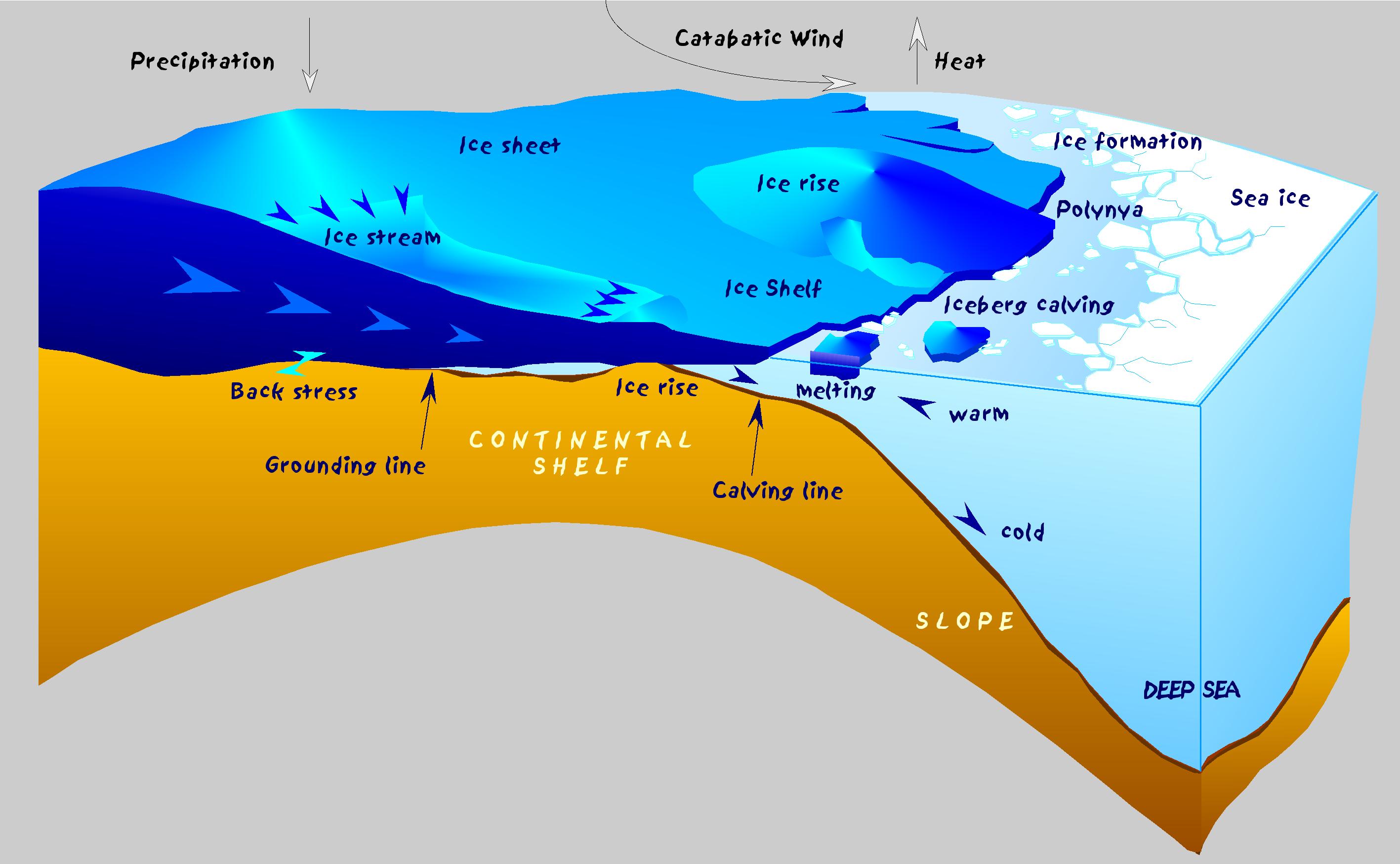
Sketch of the Antarctic coast with glaciological and oceanographic processes, showing ice rises within ice shelf

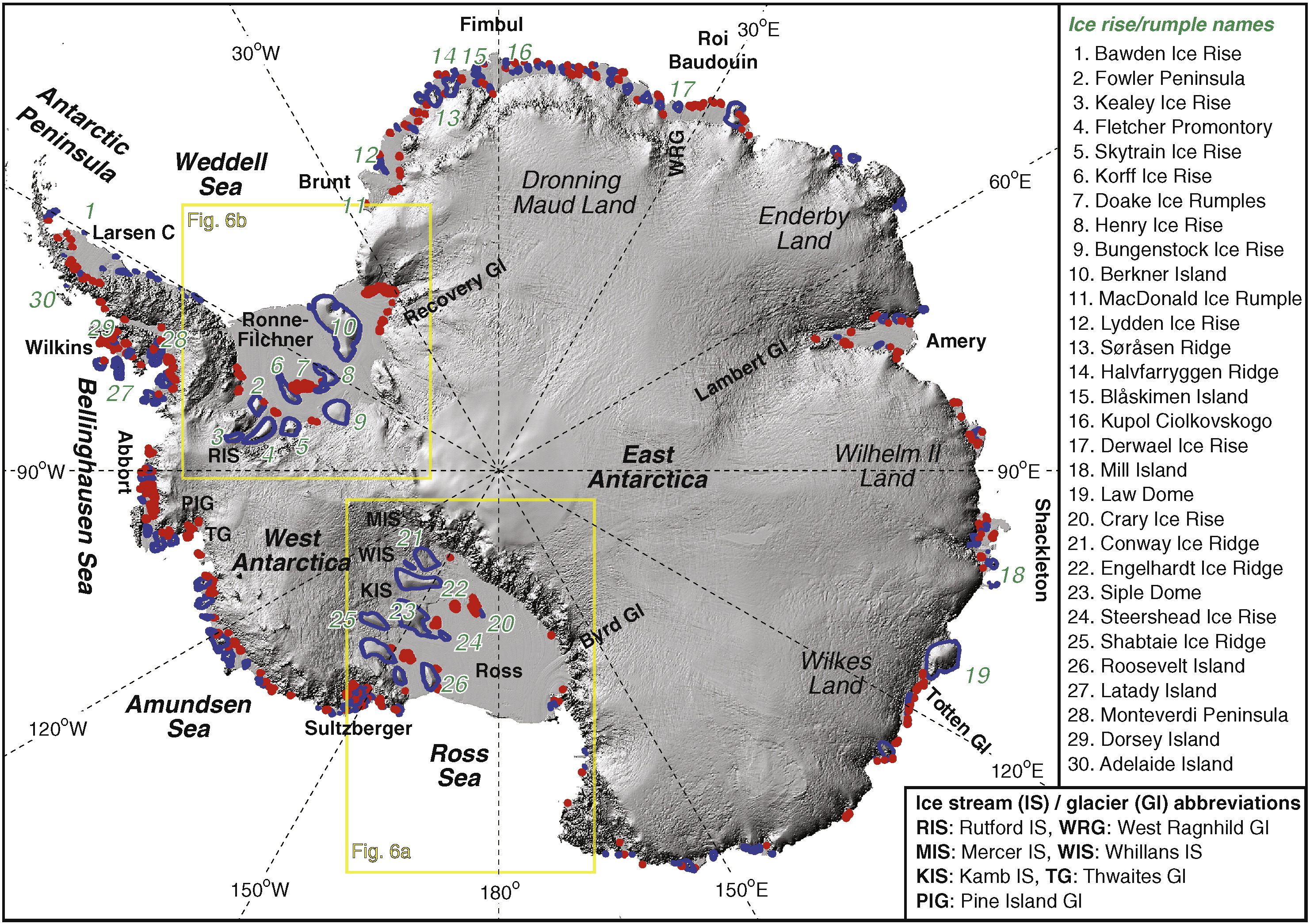
Map of ice rises and ice rumples in Antarctica

An ice rise is a clearly defined elevation of the otherwise very much flatter ice shelf, typically dome-shaped and rising several hundreds of metres above the surrounding ice shelf. An ice rise forms where the ice shelf touches the seabed due to a locally increased elevation of the seabed, which however remains below sea level. (In contrast, an elevation in the seabed that extends above sea level is defined as an island). The ice shelf flows over the seabed elevation, completely covering it with ice, thereby forming an ice rise. The resulting stress increases cause crevasse formation around the ice rise.

An island within and totally covered by the ice shelf may appear the same as an ice rise. Elaborate measurements may be required to distinguish between these two geographic features.

Although ice rises are typically located within the ice shelf area, they can partially face the open sea. Ice rises are found within the ice shelves of Antarctica. There is also one found associated with the Ward Hunt Ice Shelf and it is called the Ward Hunt Ice Rise. The largest ice rises exceed dimensions of 50 by 200 km (31 by 124 mi), or 10,000 km^{2} (3,900 sq mi) in area. Some ice rises are incorrectly called islands, but also a few totally ice-covered islands within an ice shelf are also called ice rises.

Ice rises are of scientific significance because they (a) exert considerable buttressing, which affects the existence and rate of the marine ice sheet instability; and (b) they are very good sites for ice coring, owing to their being somewhat thinner than the main ice-sheet (hundreds of metres compared with thousands of metres).

Ice rises, grouped by ice shelf, clockwise starting in East Antarctica:

- Brunt Ice Shelf
  - McDonald Ice Rumples
- Riiser-Larsen Ice Shelf
  - Lyddan Island
- King Baudouin Ice Shelf
  - Derwael Ice Rise
- Amery Ice Shelf
  - Budd Ice Rumples
  - IR1 to IR5 near the ice front
- Shackleton Ice Shelf
  - Green Ice Rises (the northernmost ice rise, at 66°21'S)
  - Harrisson Ice Rises
- Ross Ice Shelf
  - Crary Ice Rise (the southernmost ice rise, at 82°56'S)
  - Roosevelt Island
- Crosson Ice Shelf
  - Davis Ice Rise
- Bach Ice Shelf
  - Burgess Ice Rise
  - Dvořák Ice Rise
  - Ives Ice Rise
  - Landy Ice Rises
- George VI Ice Shelf
  - Martin Ice Rise
- Wilkins Ice Shelf
  - Petrie Ice Rises
  - Schaus Ice Rises
  - Vere Ice Rise
- Wordie Ice Shelf
  - Coker Ice Rise
  - Linchpin Ice Rise
  - Miller Ice Rise
  - Napier Ice Rise
  - Reynolds Ice Rise
  - Wade Ice Rise
- Müller Ice Shelf
  - Humphreys Ice Rise
- Larsen-C Ice Shelf
  - Bawden Ice Rise
  - Gipps Ice Rise
  - Tharp Ice Rise
- Filchner-Ronne Ice Shelf
  - Belgrano II
  - Berkner Island
  - Bungenstock Ice Rise
  - Doake Ice Rumples
  - Dott Ice Rise
  - Fletcher Ice Rise
  - Fowler Ice Rise
  - Hemmen Ice Rise
  - Henry Ice Rise
  - Kealey Ice Rise
  - Kershaw Ice Rumples
  - Korff Ice Rise
  - Skytrain Ice Rise

Henry and Korff Ice Rises are the largest ice rises, with areas of roughly 1 500 to 1 600 km^{2}.
