= David Martin =

David or Dave Martin may refer to:

== Entertainment ==
- David Martin (artist) (1737–1797), Scottish painter and engraver
- David Stone Martin (1913–1992), American artist
- David Martin (poet) (1915–1997), Hungarian-Australian poet and novelist
- David Martin (singer), English singer-songwriter
- Dave Martin (screenwriter) (1935–2007), writer for the television program Doctor Who
- Dave Martin (jazz musician) (1907–1975), jazz pianist and songwriter
- David A. Martin (musician) (1937–1987), American pop musician with Sam the Sham & the Pharaohs
- Dave Martin (chef), contestant on the reality television program Top Chef
- David L. Martin, role-playing games artist

== Politics ==
- David Martin (Michigan politician) (born 1961), Republican state assemblyman
- David Martin (Nebraska politician) (1907–1997), Republican U.S. representative
- David Martin (Wisconsin politician) (1931–2025), Republican state assemblyman
- David Martin (South Carolina politician), member of the South Carolina House of Representatives
- David Martin (mayor) (born 1953), politician in Stamford, Connecticut
- David O'Brien Martin (1944–2012), Republican New York U.S. representative
- David Martin (English politician) (born 1945), Conservative MP
- David Martin (Scottish politician) (born 1954), Labour party MEP for Scotland
- Sir David Martin (governor) (1933–1990), Australian admiral, NSW governor
- David C. Martin (politician), Florida state senator

== Sports ==
=== Football ===
- Boy Martin (Davy Martin, 1914–1991), Northern Irish footballer
- Dave Martin (footballer, born 1963), English footballer
- Dave Martin (footballer, born 1985), English footballer with Whitehawk F.C.
- David Martin (footballer, born 1964), Scottish footballer
- David Martin (footballer, born 1986), English football goalkeeper
- David Martín (footballer, born 1992), Spanish footballer
- Dave Martin (linebacker) (born 1946), American football linebacker
- David Martin (cornerback) (born 1959), American football player
- David Martin (tight end) (born 1979), American football player
- Dave Martin (soccer) (born 1988), American soccer player

=== Other sports ===
- David Martin (tennis) (born 1981)
- David Martín (water polo) (born 1977), Spanish water polo player
- Dave Martin (snooker player) (born 1948), English snooker player
- David Martin (gymnast) (born 1977), French trampoline gymnast

== Other ==
- David Martin (French theologian) (1639–1721), French theologian
- David Grier Martin (1910–1974), president of Davidson College
- Sir David Christie Martin (1914–1976), Scottish-born scientific administrator
- David Martin (criminal), escaped prisoner in the 1980s
- David A. Martin (lawyer), American lawyer
- David Martin (Kansas judge) (1839–1901), Chief Justice of the Kansas Supreme Court
- David Martin (journalist) (born 1943), American television news correspondent
- David Martin (sociologist) (1929–2019), British academic
- David C. Martin, American architect
- David N. Martin (1930–2012), American advertising executive
- Dave Martin (sportscaster), American sports announcer

== See also ==
- David Forbes Martyn (1906–1970), Scottish-born Australian physicist and radiographer
- David Marteen, Dutch privateer
- David Martín (disambiguation)
- David Martí (born 1971), actor and makeup specialist
