= Roosevelt Island, Antarctica =

Island in Antarctica

Roosevelt Island
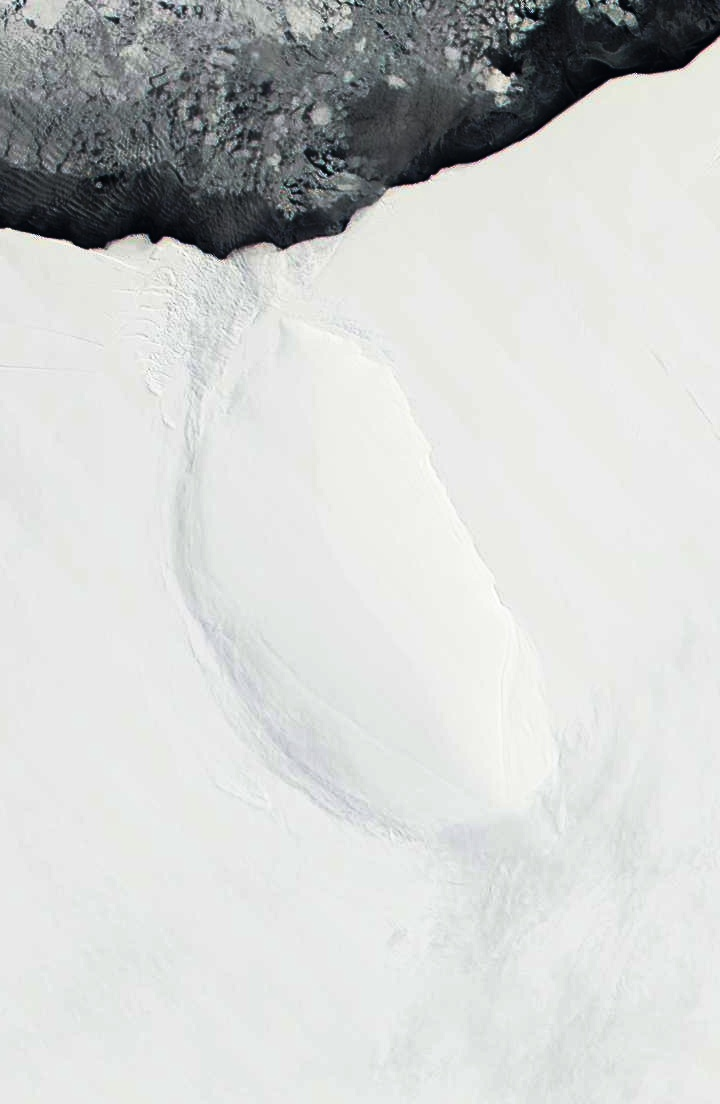
- November 2001 satellite image of Roosevelt Island

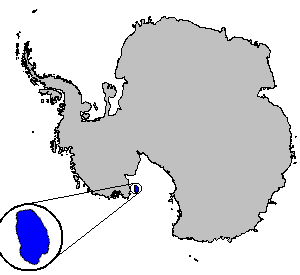
- Location of Roosevelt Island in Antarctica

Geography
- Location: Antarctica
- Coordinates: 79°25′S 162°00′W
- Area: 7,500 km^{2} (2,900 sq mi)
- Area rank: 91st
- Length: 130 km (81 mi)
- Width: 65 km (40.4 mi)
- Highest elevation: 550 m (1800 ft)

Administration
- Administered under the Antarctic Treaty System

Demographics
- Population: Data not available

Additional information
- Claimed by New Zealand as part of the Ross Dependency.

Roosevelt Island is the second largest ice rise of Antarctica and world-wide, after Berkner Island. Despite its name, it is not an island, since the bedrock below the ice at its highest part is below sea level. It is about 130 km (81 mi) long in a NW-SE direction, 65 km (40 mi) wide and about 7,500 km^{2} (2,896 sq mi) in area, lying under the eastern part of the Ross Ice Shelf of Antarctica. Its central ridge rises to about 550 m (1,804 ft) above sea level, but this and all other elevations of the ice rise are completely covered by ice, so that it is invisible at ground level.

Examination of how the ice flows above it establishes the existence and extent of the ice rise. Radar surveying carried out between 1995 and 2013 showed that the Raymond Effect was operating beneath the ice divide. The ice rise has become a focus of the Roosevelt Island Climate Evolution (RICE) research using ice coring.

Rear Admiral Richard E. Byrd named it in 1934 after US President Franklin D. Roosevelt. Byrd was the leader of the expedition that discovered the ice rise. Roosevelt Island lies within the boundaries of the Ross Dependency, New Zealand's Antarctic claim.

== See also ==
- Composite Antarctic Gazetteer
- SCAR
- Territorial claims in Antarctica
