= Vere Ice Rise =

Vere Ice Rise (70°27′S 72°44′W) is a small ice rise lying merged within the Wilkins Ice Shelf, lying off the west coast of Alexander Island, Antarctica. It was roughly mapped from the air by British Antarctic Survey on a radio echo sounding flight on 1 February 1967, and later accurately positioned from U.S. Landsat imagery of February 1979. It was named by the United Kingdom Antarctic Place-Names Committee in 1980 after Flight Lieutenant Robert P. Vere, RAF, the second pilot of the Twin Otter aircraft used on the British Antarctic Survey flight.

== See also ==
- Dvořák Ice Rise
- Martin Ice Rise
- Petrie Ice Rises
