= Guðfinna Aðalgeirsdóttir =

Icelandic academic

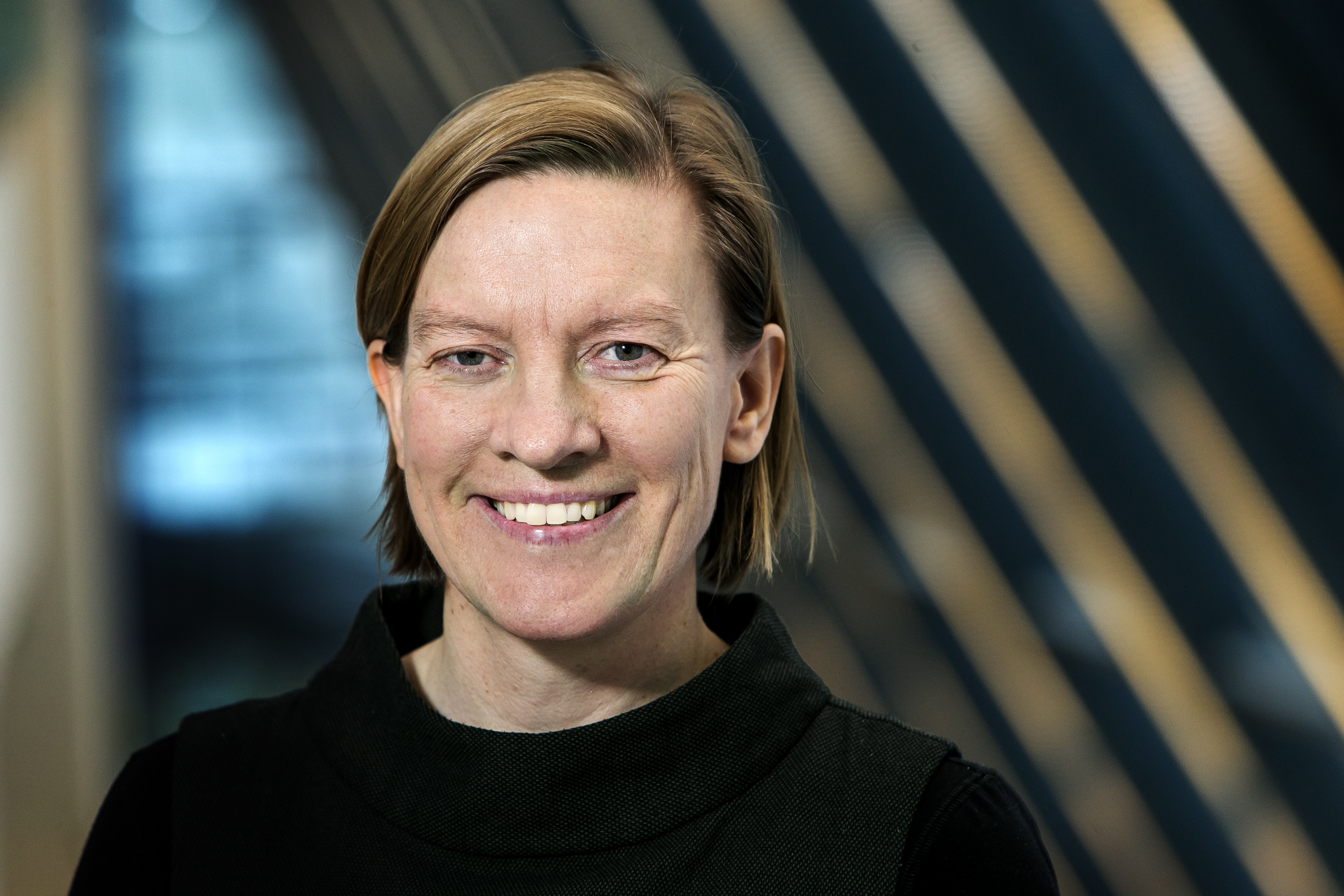
- Born: 1972 (age 53–54)
- Occupations: professor in Geophysics at the Faculty of Earth Sciences, University of Iceland

Guðfinna 'Tollý' Aðalgeirsdóttir (born 1972) is professor in Geophysics at the Faculty of Earth Sciences, University of Iceland.

== Professional career ==
Guðfinna was born in Akureyri, on the north coast of Iceland, 20 March 1972. She completed grammar school with a matriculation exam from the physics line of Menntaskólinn á Akureyri in spring 1991. She then studied geophysics at the University of Iceland and graduated with a B.Sc. degree in spring 1994. During the summers of 1993 and 1994 and winter 1994–1995, she worked at the Science Institute, University of Iceland, with Helgi Björnsson and the glaciology group processing radio-echo sounding measurements, and she participated in expeditions on Vatnajökull ice cap. She went to graduate school at the University of Alaska Fairbanks to study glaciers and graduated in autumn 1997 with an M.Sc. degree. From 1998 to 2002, she was a PhD student at the Swiss Federal Institute of Technology in Zürich and graduated in February 2003 with a Dr. sc. nat. degree.

She returned to Iceland and worked with Helgi Björnsson and the glaciology group at the Science Institute on numerical models for Langjökull, Hofsjökull and Vatnajökull in collaboration with glaciologists at the Icelandic Meteorological Office. She worked as a post-doctoral researcher and later as a lecturer at Swansea University from 2004 to 2006 in Wales, where she contributed to a research project on Rutford Ice Stream in Antarctica. She then worked at the Danish Meteorological Institute from 2006 to 2012 on coupling ice flow and climate models for the Greenland ice sheet. In summer 2012, she became associate professor in geophysics and then Professor in 2017 at the Faculty of Earth Sciences, University of Iceland.

== Research ==
Guðfinna's research focuses on glaciers and how they respond to climate change in the past, present and future, and how the sea level around Iceland is evolving due to glacier and climate changes. She applies numerical models to compute the mass balance and flow of glaciers. It is essential to have field measurements for calibrating and validating the models, and she therefore regularly participates in excursions on the glaciers. Each spring she goes with the students in the glaciology course at the University of Iceland to Sólheimajökull to put wires into the ice with a steam drill to measure the summer ablation of this glacier. In Alaska, Guðfinna participated in a large project to measure volume changes of Alaskan glaciers. She, her supervisor Keith Echelmeyer, and glaciologists at University of Alaska Fairbanks flew a laser altimeter in a Piper PA12 airplane over 67 glaciers to measure how their volume had changed since 1957. In Switzerland she developed a numerical ice flow model to simulate the size and evolution of the large ice caps in Iceland to make projections for their future. This project was a collaboration with scientists at the Institute of Earth Sciences at the University of Iceland and the Icelandic Meteorological office. She has used the PISM ice flow model, developed at the University of Alaska, to simulate both the Greenland Ice Sheet and Vatnajökull ice cap She participated in a project in Antarctica using measurements and models to improve understanding of the flow of Rutford Ice Stream A few years later, she measured vertical ice velocity at the Fletcher Promontory ice divide to estimate the ice viscosity. They also measured the Raymond bumps, which develop underneath an ice divide due to change in the ice viscosity; ice becomes stiffer where the stresses are low. Guðfinna collaborates in a number of projects focusing on mass balance and the climate over the Greenland ice sheet and making projections on how it will evolve due to anthropogenic climate change.

She has supervised PhD students and postdoctoral researchers at the University of Iceland, in Copenhagen in Denmark, Birmingham in UK and Bordeaux in France in projects on Vatnajökull, the Greenland ice sheet and smaller Icelandic glaciers (Virkisjökull, Drangajökull, eastern outlet glaciers of Vatnajökull and others). In these projects measurements and numerical models are applied to improve understanding of how glaciers are responding to climate change. One project uses a Bayesian hierarchical framework to compute the viscosity and flow of Langjökull and another maps how the groundwater in catchments headed by temperate glaciers evolves due to climate change.

== Various tasks and projects ==
Guðfinna has taken on various community service tasks within and outside the university and regularly gives public talks to disseminate information about anthropogenic climate change and the impact on glaciers in the world to general public, media and schools. The university community nominated her for a seat on the Icelandic Climate Council. She has been a board member of the Icelandic Glaciological Society since 2014. She was a board member of the Faculty of Earth Science, University of Iceland from 2015 to 2018 and has been a member of the Graduate Committee at the Faculty of Earth Sciences 2016–2020. She has been Iceland's national representative in the International Arctic Science Committee (IASC) Cryosphere Working Group since 2014 and has served as Chair of the Cryosphere Working Group since 2018. From 2009 to 2012 she was a member of the steering committee in the EU FP7 project Ice2sea and was on the steering committee and a theme leader in the Nordic Centre of Excellence SVALI from 2010 to 2016. Every year she reviews a number of international research papers for various science journals.

Guðfinna was selected to be one of the lead authors of the Sixth Assessment Report (AR6) of the Intergovernmental Panel on Climate Change. This report is written to inform the governments of the world on anthropogenic climate change, and what impact it has on nature and society. The writing of the report started in the summer 2018. It will come out in April 2021. Guðfinna is in a group of 17 scientists writing Chapter 9 on Ocean, Cryosphere and Sea Level Change.

== Honours ==
In Summer 2019, the UK Antarctic Place-names Committee approved a suggestion to name a nunatak that has been used as a GPS reference point “Tolly Nunatak”. Tollý has been Guðfinna's nickname since childhood. The name and location of the place is: Tolly Nunatak (78°23’43.9”S, 84°30’15.5”W)

== Selected main written works ==
- Schmidt, Louise Steffensen, Guðfinna Aðalgeirsdóttir, Finnur Pálsson, Peter L. Langen, Sverrir Guðmundsson, Helgi Björnsson. Dynamic simulations of Vatnajökull ice cap from 1980 to 2300. Journal of Glaciology. 2019.
- Gopalan, Giri; Hrafnkelsson, Birgir; Wikle, Christopher K; Rue, Håvard; Aðalgeirsdóttir, Guðfinna; Jarosch, Alexander H; Pálsson, Finnur. A Hierarchical Spatio-Temporal Statistical Model for Physical Systems. Journal of Agricultural, Biological and Environmental Statistics, 1-24. 2019.
- Aðalgeirsdóttir, G., A. Aschwanden, C. Khroulev, F. Boberg, R. Mottram, P. Lucas-Picher, J. H. Christensen. Role of model initialization for projections of 21st-century Greenland ice sheet mass loss. Journal of Glaciology, Vol. 60, No. 222, 2014.
- Aschwanden, A., G. Aðalgeirsdóttir and C. Khroulev. Hindcasting to measure ice sheet model sensitivity to initial states. The Cryopshere, 7, 1083–1093. 2013.
- Aðalgeirsdóttir, G., S. Guðmundsson, H. Björnsson, F. Pálsson, T. Jóhannesson, H. Hannesdóttir, S. Þ. Sigurðsson, E. Berthier. [www.the-cryosphere.net/5/961/2011/ Modelling the 20th and 21st century evolution of Hoffellsjökull glacier, SE-Vatnajökull, Iceland]. The Cryosphere, 5, 961–975, 2011.
