= Burgess Ice Rise =

Small ice rise

Burgess Ice Rise (70°23′S 73°21′W) is a small ice rise lying within the Wilkins Ice Shelf, off the west coast of Alexander Island, Antarctica. It was mapped from the air on a radio echo sounding flight by the British Antarctic Survey on 11 February 1967, and later accurately positioned from U.S. Landsat imagery of February 1979. It was named by the UK Antarctic Place-Names Committee in 1980 after Flight Lieutenant Robert William Burgess, Royal Air Force pilot in command of the Twin Otter aircraft on the flight.

== See also ==
- Petrie Ice Rises
- Martin Ice Rise
