= Coker Ice Rise =

- Location within Antarctica

Highest point
- Coordinates: 69°4′S 67°8′W

Geography
- Location: Graham Land, Antarctic Peninsula

Coker Ice Rise is a small ice rise in Wordie Ice Shelf, 6 nautical miles (11 km) west-northwest of the Triune Peaks, Fallières Coast. It was photographed from the air by the Ronne Antarctic Research Expedition, 1947–48, and surveyed by the Falkland Islands Dependencies Survey, 1958. It was named by the Advisory Committee on Antarctic Names for Walter B. Coker, U.S. Navy, radioman, Palmer Station winter party, 1969.
