= Schau =

Schau is a surname. Notable people with the surname include:

- Justin Schau (born 1998), German footballer
- Kristopher Schau (born 1970), Norwegian musician, comedian and radio host
- Ryan Schau (born 1975), American football player
- Virginia Schau (1915–1989), American photographer

== See also ==
- Schau's Buss, a Norwegian bus company
- Schau- und Sichtungsgarten Hermannshof
- Schau, lieber Gott, wie meine Feind, BWV 153 ("See, dear God, how my enemies"), BWV 153, a church cantata by Johann Sebastian Bach
- Trau, schau, wem! ("Take Care in Whom You Trust!"), Op. 463, a waltz composed by Johann Strauss II
- Mach Schau (disambiguation)
- Schaus
