= Crary =

Crary may refer to:

== People ==
- Albert P. Crary, polar geophysicist and glaciologist
- Alice Crary, moral philosopher
- Catherine Crary, American historian
- Isaac E. Crary, U.S. Representative from Michigan
- John Crary (ca. 1784-1848), New York politician
- Jonathan Crary, art critic and essayist
- Scott Crary (born 1978), American film director, producer and writer
- William Crary Brownell, American essayist and art critic

== Places ==
- Crary Mountains, a group of Antarctic mountains
- Crary, North Dakota, a city in Ramsey County
- Craryville, New York, a hamlet in Columbia County

== Other uses ==
- Albert P. Crary Science and Engineering Center, polar laboratorium at McMurdo Station
- Crary Ice Rise, an Antarctic ice rise
