= Iceberg A-38 =

Large iceberg that split from the Filchner-Ronne Ice Shelf in Antarctica in 1998

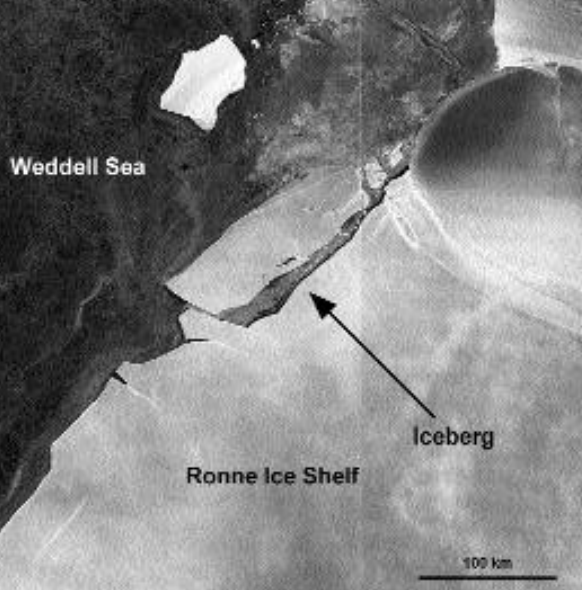
Iceberg A-38 soon after calving

A-38 was a large iceberg that split from the Filchner-Ronne Ice Shelf in Antarctica in October 1998. Soon after formation it split into two pieces, A-38A and A-38B, which drifted westwards on the Weddell Gyre. The icebergs moved north along the Antarctic Peninsula and reached its tip in February 2003. A-38A and A-38B increased speed in open sea and grounded in shallower waters to the east of South Georgia Island in December 2003. A-38A broke up into three pieces in March 2004 and drifted north where it decayed. A-38B split into two in April, with the eastern portion, now known as A-38G, drifting north and west to decay. The remainder of A-38B remained grounded, interfering with the foraging routes of seals and penguins in South Georgia, resulting in the deaths of their young. On 20 August 2004, A38-B broke into two, with the new portion drifting north and breaking up. The remainder of A-38B continued to break up through September 2004 and had completely decayed by 2005.

== Calving ==
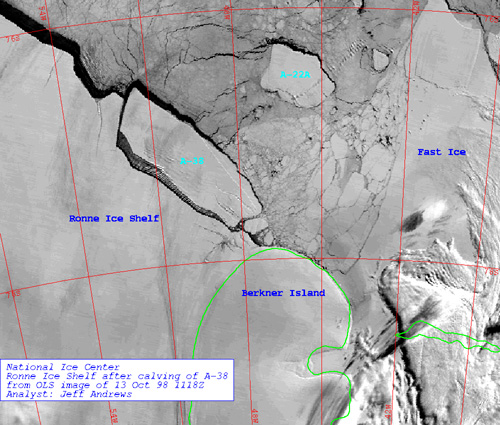
Iceberg A-38 and Berkner Island on 13 October

Iceberg A-38 calved from the Filchner-Ronne Ice Shelf, Antarctica, in October 1998 from a position near to Berkner Island. The calving was caused by stresses imposed on the ice shelf by the Hemmen Ice Rise. The calving was witnessed over a period of decades as inlets in the shelf, which filled with sea ice, snow and small icebergs, gradually grew in size. Two of these inlets, one perpendicular to the front of the ice shelf and one parallel to it, met and led to the formation of A-38. At the point of calving the iceberg was 150 kilometres (93 mi) by 50 kilometres (31 mi) in size. It was first recognised on 13 October 1998 by United States National Ice Center scientist Mary Keller from imagery provided via the Defense Meteorological Satellite Program, though Glenn Grant and Jeff Otten of the United States Antarctic Program's Palmer Station claimed to have spotted the iceberg the same day. The iceberg carried with it Filchner Station, a German research post, manned only during the summer. The Germans hoped to land on the iceberg to recover equipment from the post during the southern summer of 1998–1999.

At 2,750 square miles (7,100 km^{2}) A-38 was the largest iceberg that had been observed in a decade, the previous largest being B-9 observed in October 1987. The calving was regarded by the National Oceanic and Atmospheric Administration as "a possible indicator of global warming". By 16 October it had moved a couple of miles away from the parent ice mass.

== Splitting and movement north ==
Positions of A-38 fragments in March 2003

By 22 October 1998, A-38 began to split. The iceberg split into two pieces of about equal size that were named A-38A and A-38B, with A-38A being the eastern portion of the original iceberg and A-38B the western portion.

Both portions drifted in the Weddell Gyre westwards towards the Antarctic Peninsula before moving north. The speed of the icebergs varied according to the quantity and thickness of surrounding sea ice, moving much slower in winter than in summer. The icebergs reached the tip of the Antarctic Peninsula in February 2003 and continued to progress northwards away from the continent. Their progress was tracked by the Moderate Resolution Imaging Spectroradiometer satellite. Although both icebergs calved at their edges, their overall shape was largely unaffected.

By March 2003, the iceberg had split into four pieces and were reported at the following locations:

- A-38A at 61°42′S 52°24′W measuring 22 miles (35 km) by 48 miles (77 km)
- A-38B at 63°00′S 51°54′W measuring 22 miles (35 km) by 25 miles (40 km)
- A-38C at 60°30′S 49°48′W measuring 7 miles (11 km) by 11 miles (18 km)
- A-38D at 63°42′S 52°36′W measuring 2 miles (3.2 km) by 10 miles (16 km)

== South Georgia ==
The splitting of A-38B in April 2004

A-38A and A-38B increased speed during their drift in open sea and both icebergs approached South Georgia Island, some 1,500 nautical miles (2,800 km) north of their initial position, in December 2003. Both icebergs grounded in shallow seas some distance to the east of the island. On 15 March 2004, A-38A broke into three pieces and began to drift northwards once more. After a few weeks their progress could no longer be monitored by medium-resolution satellite imagery. In January 2004, another fragment of A-38, A-38D, which was covered in meltwater ponds, had drifted past South Georgia.

A-38B remained grounded 100 kilometres (62 mi) off South Georgia and on 12 April 2004 was measured at 25 nautical miles (46 km) in length. It had broken into two portions, almost equal in size, by 15 April 2004. The western portion remained known as A-38B while the eastern portion was named A-38G. From 17 to 18 April, A-38G drifted north and then west, decaying below satellite imagery detection capability within a few weeks. Iceberg A-38B remained grounded for some months, affecting the foraging routes of adult seals and penguins, resulting in the death of young penguins and seals on the beaches of South Georgia. A-38B broke into two along an existing crackline on 20 August 2004. The new iceberg fragment drifted northwards and broke up. A-38B continued to break up through August and September 2004 and had disappeared by 2005.

== Documentation ==
A-38 offered researchers an opportunity to observe the breaking up and decay of an iceberg, though satellite imagery was affected by heavy cloud cover in the region around South Georgia. As the iceberg was grounded (and therefore stationary) high-resolution imagery from the Advanced Spaceborne Thermal Emission and Reflection Radiometer satellite could be ordered to investigate it. This allowed researchers to test models of melting and decay against a real-life example.

== See also ==
- Iceberg A-68 July 2017 to November 2020 (continuing)
