= Doake Ice Rumples =

Doake Ice Rumples (79°45′S 67°0′W) is an area of disturbed ice in the Ronne Ice Shelf, extending for about 55 nautical miles (100 km) in a northwest–southeast direction between Korff Ice Rise and Henry Ice Rise. It was first visited and mapped in part by the US–International Geophysical Year geophysical traverse party from Ellsworth Station 1957–58, led by Edward Thiel, and was further delineated from U.S. Landsat imagery taken 1974 and from radio echo sounding by the British Antarctic Survey (BAS) in 1981. It was named by the UK Antarctic Place-Names Committee after Christopher S.M. Doake, a senior BAS glaciologist from 1973, who has contributed to an understanding of the morphology and dynamics of the Ronne Ice Shelf.
