= Derwael Ice Rise =

Coordinates: 70°15′S 26°30′E

Derwael Ice Rise is 40 km long, 35 km wide and about 400 m tall ice rise in ice shelf off Princess Ragnhild Coast, Antarctica. Situated 70 km east of Breid Bay in northern part of Roi Baudouin Ice Shelf, directly in front of Western Ragnhild Glacier. Named for geodesist of Belgian Antarctic expedition Jean-Jacques Derwael.

Studies suggest that Derwael Ice Rise has remain relatively stable over the last millennia.
