= Reynolds Ice Rise =

Reynolds Ice Rise (69°3′S 67°1′W) is a small ice rise lying 3 nautical miles (6 km) southeast of Wade Ice Rise in Wordie Ice Shelf, Fallières Coast. The ice rise was mapped from U.S. Landsat imagery, 1974–79. Named by the United Kingdom Antarctic Place-Names Committee (UK-APC) in 1987 after John M. Reynolds, British Antarctic Survey (BAS) glaciologist, 1978–83, who undertook a study of intensive calving of Wordie Ice Shelf from Landsat imagery.
