= Thiel Trough =

The Thiel Trough (81°30′S 57°0′W) is a submarine trough trending NE-SW with depths reaching to 1,500 metres below sea level. The trough extends southwest from about 7630S, 3500W, in the Weddell Sea; underlies Filchner Ice Shelf and the south part of Ronne Ice Shelf, south of Henry Ice Rise; and continues west to about 8300S, 8500W, near Martin Hills. The portion northeast of the Henry Ice Rise was discovered in 1957-58 by a U.S. traverse party from Ellsworth Station and named "Crary Trough" after Albert P. Crary, chief scientist with the United States Antarctic Research Program (USARP). The southwest portion was traced by U.S. seismic traverse parties, 1958–64, and the whole delineated in greater detail by the Scott Polar Research Institute (SPRI)-National Science Foundation (NSF)-Technical University of Denmark (TUD) airborne radio echo sounding program, 1967–79.

The name "Crary Trough" was later set aside by Advisory Committee on Antarctic Names (US-ACAN) at the suggestion of Crary, who recommended that the entire trough be named after Edward C. Thiel (1928–1961). Thiel was the chief seismologist at Ellsworth Station from 1956 to 1958, the leader of the traverse party that discovered this feature, and he died in an air crash at Wilkes Station in Antarctica.
