= Kershaw Ice Rumples =

The Kershaw Ice Rumples (78°45′S 75°40′W) is a roughly 80 km^{2} (31 sq mi) region of disturbed ice between the Fletcher Ice Rise and the Korff Ice Rise, in the southwestern part of the Ronne Ice Shelf, Antarctica. The feature appears in U.S. Navy aerial photographs taken in the 1960s and in imagery obtained by the NASA Earth Resources Technology Satellite (ERTS-1), 1973–74. It was named by the UK Antarctic Place-Names Committee for John E.G. Kershaw, a senior pilot with the British Antarctic Survey, 1974–75.
