= Siple Dome =

Geographic feature in Antarctica

Siple Dome Field Camp
- Camp
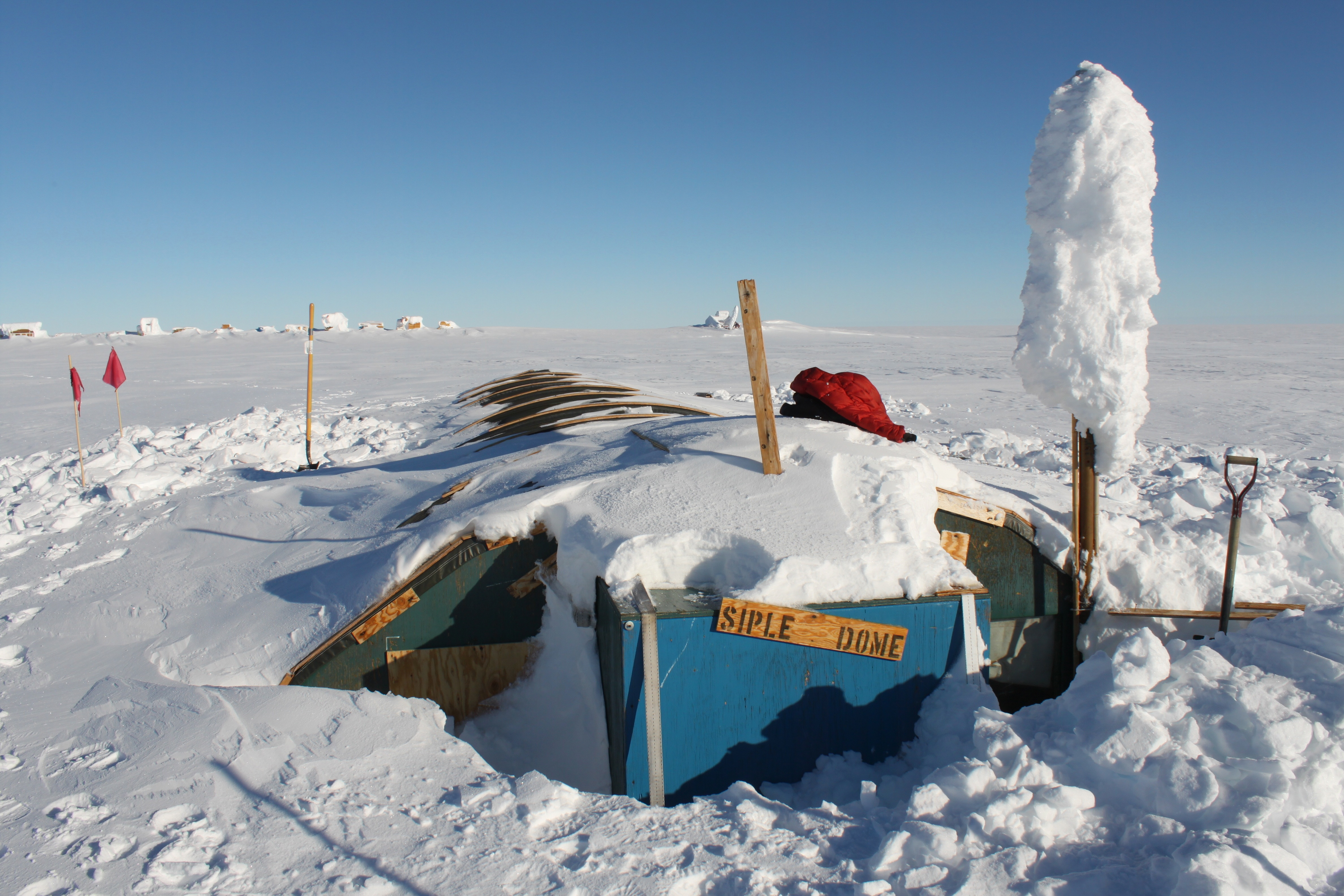
- Siple Dome Field Camp in 2012

- Location within Antarctica
- Coordinates: 81°39′15″S 149°00′18″W
- Country: United States
- Location in Antarctica: Siple Dome; Marie Byrd Land; Antarctica
- Administered by: National Science Foundation
- Established: 1996
- Elevation: 2,400 ft (730 m)

Population
  - Total: Up to 60
- Type: Seasonal

Siple Dome (81°39′15″S 149°00′18″W) is an ice dome approximately 100 km wide and 100 km long, located 130 km east of Siple Coast in Antarctica. Charles Bentley and Robert Thomas established a "strain rosette" on this feature to determine ice movement in 1973–74. They referred to the feature as Siple Dome because of its proximity to Siple Coast.

== Siple Dome ice core ==
The Siple Dome ice core project (79.468° S 112.086° W) was conducted by the United States National Science Foundation. The deepest ice was recovered in 1999 from 974 m, with an age of 97,600 years.

It is best known for the poorly-explained steps in water isotopes during the deglacial, which are unique to this core and may indicate a rapid decrease in the surface elevation of the adjoining ice streams during the deglacial and a record of atmospheric carbon dioxide. The Chief Scientist was Kendrick Taylor.

== Radar surveys of internal ice structure ==
In the 1990s a team from the University of Washington and St Olaf College surveyed the ice, measuring thickness and determining internal structure, finding evidence for the operation of the Raymond Effect. They also found that the ice had a maximum thickness of around 1000 m.

== In popular culture ==
- A documentary on climate change research associated with the Siple Dome ice core was produced by Nova: Warnings from the Ice, 1998. The documentary explains how reductions in Antarctic ice mass can raise sea level.
- Siple Dome is referenced in the song "Fall of Sipledome" by thrash metal band Testament (on their 1999 album The Gathering).

== Climate ==
The climate is ice cap (Köppen: ET), as is most of the continent. Without marine moderation and a few hundred meters above sea level, it has one of the harshest winters on the continent outside the Antarctic Plateaus. Unlike Alert, NU at slightly higher latitude and positive high averages during summer, in Siple Dome temperatures remain below freezing during the afternoon of the warmer months on average.

Climate data for Siple dome, elevation: 620 m or 2,030 ft, 1997-2011 normals and extremes
Month	Jan	Feb	Mar	Apr	May	Jun	Jul	Aug	Sep	Oct	Nov	Dec	Year
Record high °C (°F)	11.4 (52.5)	7.1 (44.8)	−4.6 (23.7)	−4.6 (23.7)	−4.9 (23.2)	−5.9 (21.4)	−8.6 (16.5)	−8.8 (16.2)	−5.6 (21.9)	0.0 (32.0)	3.1 (37.6)	7.4 (45.3)	11.4 (52.5)
Mean daily maximum °C (°F)	−5.5 (22.1)	−11.3 (11.7)	−18.0 (−0.4)	−22.5 (−8.5)	−24.7 (−12.5)	−23.5 (−10.3)	−26.1 (−15.0)	−28.9 (−20.0)	−25.0 (−13.0)	−18.1 (−0.6)	−10.2 (13.6)	−5.3 (22.5)	−18.3 (−0.9)
Daily mean °C (°F)	−9.8 (14.4)	−15.7 (3.7)	−22.5 (−8.5)	−26.6 (−15.9)	−29.0 (−20.2)	−27.6 (−17.7)	−30.3 (−22.5)	−32.9 (−27.2)	−29.8 (−21.6)	−23.6 (−10.5)	−15.1 (4.8)	−9.8 (14.4)	−22.7 (−8.9)
Mean daily minimum °C (°F)	−13.3 (8.1)	−19.3 (−2.7)	−26.4 (−15.5)	−30.6 (−23.1)	−33.3 (−27.9)	−31.7 (−25.1)	−34.4 (−29.9)	−37.1 (−34.8)	−33.9 (−29.0)	−27.9 (−18.2)	−18.7 (−1.7)	−13.3 (8.1)	−26.7 (−16.0)
Record low °C (°F)	−22.9 (−9.2)	−33.9 (−29.0)	−41.8 (−43.2)	−49.9 (−57.8)	−49.6 (−57.3)	−56.6 (−69.9)	−54.6 (−66.3)	−59.4 (−74.9)	−53.9 (−65.0)	−44.8 (−48.6)	−37.9 (−36.2)	−21.9 (−7.4)	−59.4 (−74.9)
Source: Climatebase.ru

== See also ==
- WAIS Divide
- Antarctic field camps
- Airports in Antarctica
