= Napier Island =

Island in Graham Land, Antarctica

- Location within Antarctica

Geography
- Location: Antarctica
- Coordinates: 69°14′S 67°47′W
- Length: 1.5 km (0.93 mi)

Administration
- Administered under the Antarctic Treaty System

Demographics
- Population: Uninhabited

Napier Island is an island, 1.5 kilometres (0.8 nmi) long, in the southeastern part of Marguerite Bay, 22 kilometres (12 nmi) west-northwest of Mount Balfour on the Fallières Coast. Following survey and mapping as an ice rise in the Wordie Ice Shelf by the Falkland Islands Dependencies Survey in 1958, this feature was named Napier Ice Rise by the UK Antarctic Place-names Committee (UK-APC). The name was amended to Napier Island by the UK-APC after a general eastward recession of the Wordie Ice Front (around 1999) revealed it was an island. In association with the names of pioneers of navigation grouped in this area, it was named after John Napier (1550-1617), the Scottish mathematician who invented logarithms and published his first tables in 1614.
