= Fletcher Ice Rise =

Fletcher Ice Rise (78°20′S 81°0′W), or Fletcher Promontory, is a large ice rise, 100 miles (160 km) long and 40 miles (64 km) wide, at the southwest side of the Ronne Ice Shelf, Antarctica. The feature is completely ice covered and rises between Rutford Ice Stream and Carlson Inlet. The ice rise was observed, photographed and roughly sketched by Lieutenant Ronald F. Carlson, U.S. Navy, in the course of a C-130 aircraft flight of December 14–15, 1961 from McMurdo Sound to this vicinity and returning. It was mapped in detail by the U.S. Geological Survey from Landsat imagery taken 1973–74, and was named by the Advisory Committee on Antarctic Names for Joseph O. Fletcher, director of the Office of Polar Programs, National Science Foundation, 1971–74.

Between 2005 and 2007 extensive ground-based and airborne radar surveys by teams from the British Antarctic Survey (BAS) were carried out, which obtained information about the thickness and internal structure of the ice mass, confirming operation of the Raymond Effect at the ice divide. In 2011-12 further radar surveying was done by Guðfinna 'Tollý' Aðalgeirsdóttir and drilling through the ice was carried out by a BAS-led team. In consequence part of the Fletcher Ice Rise was named the Hindmarsh Dome by the United Kingdom Antarctic Place-Names Committee.

== See also ==
- List of glaciers in the Antarctic
