= Schaus Ice Rises =

Schaus Ice Rises (71°3′S 72°40′W) is a group of small ice rises merged within the Wilkins Ice Shelf, aligned east–west just off the north side of Eroica Peninsula, situated off the southwest coast of Alexander Island, Antarctica. Mapped by United States Geological Survey (USGS) from U.S. Navy aerial photographs taken 1967-68 and from Landsat imagery taken 1972–73. Named by Advisory Committee on Antarctic Names (US-ACAN) for Commander Richard Schaus, U.S. Navy, assigned to the Division of Polar Programs, National Science Foundation (NSF), as aviation projects officer, 1979–80.

== See also ==
- Dvořák Ice Rise
- Martin Ice Rise
- Petrie Ice Rises
