= Linchpin Ice Rise =

Linchpin Ice Rise is a small ice rise northeast of Miller Ice Rise, situated near the ice front of Wordie Ice Shelf on the Fallières Coast of Antarctica. The feature was mapped from U.S. Landsat imagery, 1974–79, and was so named by the UK Antarctic Place-Names Committee because the ice rise plays a "linchpin" role in maintaining the position of the ice front, as observed in 1979.
