= Linchpin (disambiguation) =

Linchpin or lynchpin may refer to:

- Linchpin, a fastener
- Linchpin (international relations), a "kingmaker" state
- Linchpin (song), a song by Fear Factory
- Linchpin Ice Rise

== See also ==
- Linchpins of Liberty v. United States
