= Meyer Hills =

Small group of hills in Antarctica

The Meyer Hills (79°47′S 81°6′W) are a small group of hills which includes Beaudoin Peak, located between the Enterprise Hills and the head of Constellation Inlet, in the Heritage Range, Ellsworth Mountains, Antarctica. They were named by the University of Minnesota Ellsworth Mountains Party of 1962–63 for Harvey J. Meyer, a geologist with that party.

== Features ==
Geographical features include:

- Beaudoin Peak
- Holt Peak
- Seaquist Peak
- Skytrain Ice Rise
