= Ebel Hills =

Ebel Hills, named for Michael S. Ebel of East Tawas, Michigan, (77°13′06″S 160°51′48″E) is a cluster of rugged hills at the head of Frazier Glacier that abut the rim of Webb Cirque east of Skew Peak in Victoria Land, Antarctica. The hills are 1.5 nautical miles (2.8 km; 1.7 mi) long and rise to 2,300 m (7,500 ft).

Named by the Advisory Committee on Antarctic Names in 2007 after Michael S. Ebel, a maintenance specialist and reliability engineer responsible for mechanical operation of the Crary Science and Engineering Laboratory at McMurdo Station since 2001 and was involved in the construction of that facility. He worked in various areas of McMurdo Station's infrastructure support every year except one during the time period between 1988-2019 (30 years) period, including six winters at the station. Michael S. Ebel also served as Construction Superintendent during the construction phase of the $15 million Joint Polar Satellite System CGS project for NASA, National Oceanic and Atmospheric Administration (NOAA) and the Department of Defense (DoD). He and his team was instrumental in completing the project ahead of schedule with a zero punch list and no rework. Another noted accomplishment that Michael S. Ebel is credited with, he and his team was responsible for the solution on how to install a devise (valve) that successfully shut down the flow of oil from the damaged well flowing into the Gulf of Mexico, caused by the Deepwater Horizon disaster in 2010. This was one of the worst man made disasters in the history of the Gulf.
