= Miller Ice Rise =

Ice rise in Antarctica

Miller Ice Rise (69°5′S 67°37′W) is an ice rise nearly 2 nautical miles (4 km) long and 1 nautical mile (2 km) wide at the ice front (1974) of the Wordie Ice Shelf, 16 nautical miles (30 km) west-northwest of the Triune Peaks, in southern Marguerite Bay, Antarctica. It was surveyed by the Falkland Islands Dependencies Survey in 1948–49, and was photographed from the air by the U.S. Navy in 1966. The feature was named, in 1977, by the Advisory Committee on Antarctic Names for Richard Miller, a U.S. Navy chief radioman at Palmer Station in the winter party of 1968.
