= David Martín =

David Martín may refer to:

- David Martín (water polo) (born 1977), Spanish water polo player
- David Martín García (born 1992), Spanish footballer

== See also ==
- David Martin (disambiguation)
