= Bawden Ice Rise =

Antarctic ice rise

Bawden Ice Rise (66°59′S 60°50′W) is an ice rise, 8 nautical miles (15 km) long and 2 nautical miles (4 km) wide, near the edge of the Larsen Ice Shelf, 41 nautical miles (76 km) east-southeast of Cape Alexander, Graham Land. The feature, which may consist of more than one ice rise, was mapped on a British Antarctic Survey (BAS) radio echo sounding flight from Adelaide Island in February 1975, and named by the UK Antarctic Place-Names Committee in 1985 after John Bawden, who was with BAS from 1971 and after a 20 year career with them, retired from his final position as Head of Administration, Logistics and Operations in 1991.
