= King Baudouin Ice Shelf =

Ice shelf in Antarctica

Coordinates: 70°26′S 24°19′E

Location of King Baudouin Ice Shelf in Antarctica

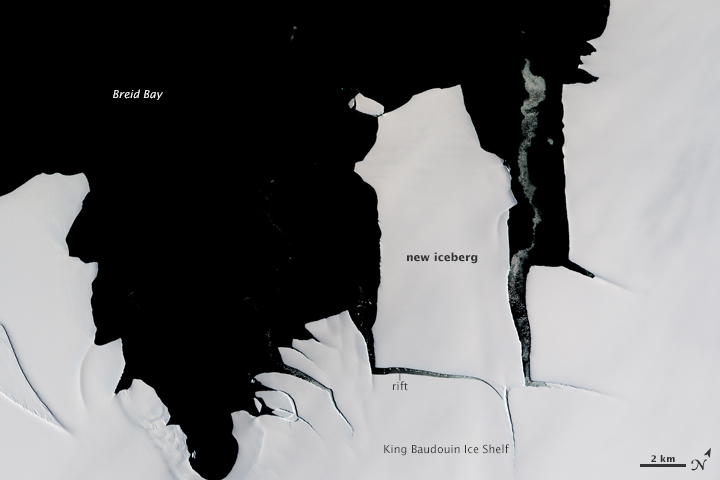
A 70-square-kilometer chunk of ice broke off from the King Baudouin Ice Shelf in January 2015. The last time that part of King Baudouin calved such a large iceberg was in the 1960s.

The King Baudouin Ice Shelf (also called Roi Baudouin Ice shelf, from French: Plateforme de glace Roi Baudouin) in Dronning Maud Land, East Antarctica, is within the Norwegian part of Antarctica. It is named after King Baudouin of Belgium (1930-1993).

== Geology ==
The King Baudouin ice shelf is confined by two ice rises (including Derwael Ice Rise) and one under-ice pinning-point with a width of only a few kilometres; the latter seems to define the seaward edge of the ice shelf and impacts ice flow in the hinterland.

== Roi Baudoin Base ==
Belgium was one of the original 12 signatories of the Antarctic Treaty. It established its Roi Baudoin Base scientific research station on the ice shelf in 1958, built for the International Geophysical Year (IGY), and decommissioned in 1967. This operated over several three year cycles: 1958–1961 and 1964–1966.

== Study ==
The ice shelf is being actively studied by Belgian Antarctic Program scientists from the Princess Elisabeth Base. This includes:

- BELARE (Belgian Antarctic Research Project), with a GPS position reference tweeting position and rate of movement, and ice depth measurements;
- Be:Wise, examining the ice dynamics where the shelf is grounded, and which buttress the ice flow from the East Antarctic ice sheet.

== Supposed meteor crater ==
In early 2015, scientists announced the discovery of an almost circular structure in the ice surface, about 2 kilometres (1.2 mi) wide. First hypothesis for its origin, among other ice-shelf processes, was the impact of a meteor. The feature was discovered by German scientist Christian Müller as he conducted an aerial survey on 20 December 2014. If found, this is likely to be the largest identified Antarctic meteorite, as the rule of thumb is that the meteorite causing a crater is about 5-10% of the diameter of the crater, or roughly 200m in this case. Initial analysis of satellite images indicates that the feature could have been present before the supposed impact, even for 25 years. In December 2016, researchers concluded that the structure is a collapsed underground lake.
