= Wade Ice Rise =

Wade Ice Rise (69°1′S 67°5′W) is a small ice rise in Wordie Ice Shelf, 8 nautical miles (15 km) northwest of Triune Peaks, Fallières Coast. Photographed from the air by Ronne Antarctic Research Expedition (RARE), 1947–48, and surveyed by Falkland Islands Dependencies Survey (FIDS), 1958. Named in 1977 by Advisory Committee on Antarctic Names (US-ACAN) after George W. Wade, Jr., U.S. Navy, Chief Construction Electrician, Palmer Station, winter party 1970.
