= Crary Bank =

- Submerged bank Crary Bank (Antarctica)
- Interactive map of Crary Bank
- Ocean: Southern Ocean

Crary Bank (75°S 169°E) is a northeast trending undersea bank of the central Ross continental shelf. It was named, in association with Crary Ice Rise, for A.P. Crary, an American geophysicist, the name being approved by the Advisory Committee for Undersea Features in June 1988.
