= Filchner Station =

Filchner Station Filchner-Station
- Antarctic research station
- Location in Antarctica
- Coordinates: 77°03′00″S 50°03′00″W
- Region: Filchner–Ronne Ice Shelf
- Established: February 1982
- Removed: February 1999
- Named after: Wilhelm Filchner

Government
  - Type: Administration
  - Body: AWI, Germany
- Active times: Every summer
- Website: awi.de

Filchner Station was a German research station in the Antarctic. Administered by the Alfred Wegener Institute for Polar and Marine Research, it was established in February 1982 on the Filchner–Ronne Ice Shelf. The first station in Antarctica to be mounted on jacks, the structure was raised each year to allow for the increase in height of the shelf by snowfall. It was also relocated around 1 kilometre (0.62 mi) southwards each year to account for drift of the ice shelf. In October 1998, Filchner Station was stranded on iceberg A-38 when it broke away from the ice shelf. Research operations were cancelled and an emergency salvage operation was carried out that removed the majority of the station by February 1999.

== Establishment and operation ==
The Filchner Station was established by the West German Alfred Wegener Institute for Polar and Marine Research (AWI) in February 1982. The station consisted of steel containers housing living quarters and laboratories. The station was the first in the Antarctic to be mounted on jacks, allowing it to be raised in line with the increase in height of its surroundings due to snowfall. The structure was typically jacked up by around 1 metre (3.3 ft) each year. The structure could accommodate up to 26 personnel but was typically occupied only in the southern summer and by 12 people. The station was sited approximately 20 kilometres (12 mi) from the edge of the Filchner–Ronne Ice Shelf which slowly drifts away from the continent. To counteract this movement the station was moved around 1 kilometre (0.62 mi) southwards each of the 17 summers that it was staffed.

The station was resupplied by the AWI vessel Polarstern and also by Dornier aircraft which flew between the station, the German Neumayer Station II, the British Rothera Research Station and the Chilean Teniente R. Marsh Airport. The Filchner Station conducted studies on the mass of the ice shelf, geological and geophysical investigations in the Weddell Sea and meteorological work. Automatic instrumentation was installed to continue geophysical and meteorological investigations throughout the year, not just the summer period when the station was staffed.

== Loss ==
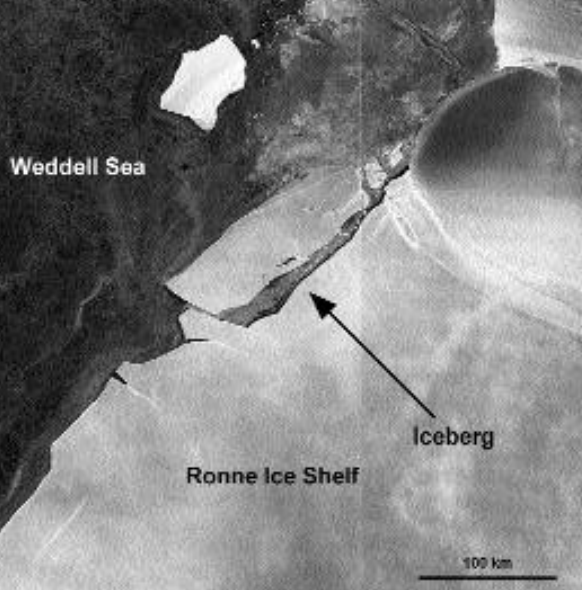
Iceberg A-38 calving from the Filchner–Ronne Ice Shelf

In October 1998 iceberg A-38 calved from the Filchner–Ronne Ice Shelf, the largest iceberg to do so for decades, carrying with it the Filchner Station. The station was to have been the main base for an 800 kilometres (500 mi) expedition in 1999; this was cancelled and replaced with an emergency salvage operation. The recovery of the base was a requirement of the environmental portions of the Antarctic Treaty. On 22 October A-38 split into two, Filchner remained on the western portion which became known as A-38B.

The 10-man salvage team travelled on board Polarstern in early 1999 but became stranded in thick ice some 150 kilometres (93 mi) from the station. The ship was eventually freed and reached the 20 metres (66 ft) high edge of the iceberg in early February. Over the following 10 days some 120 tonnes (120 long tons) of the station were recovered as well as a further 50 tonnes (49 long tons) of vehicles. All that was left behind was the platform that the station was founded on. The loss of the station left the German research programme with only the Neumayer Station II in Antarctica.
