= Henry Ice Rise =

Coordinates: 80°35′S 62°0′W

Henry Ice Rise is a triangular-shaped ice rise about 70 miles (110 km) long located between Korff Ice Rise and the southern portion of Berkner Island in the Ronne Ice Shelf, Antarctica. It was first visited by the United States International Geophysical Year geophysical traverse party from Ellsworth Station, 1957–58, and was named by the Advisory Committee on Antarctic Names after Captain Clifford D. Henry of the Military Sealift Command, a veteran American polar sea captain and master of USNS Private John R. Towle (T-AK-240). Henry died aboard his ship on February 16, 1975, while returning from his fourteenth voyage to Antarctica in support of the U.S. Antarctic Research Program.
