= David Vaughan (glaciologist) =

British glaciologist and climate scientist (1962–2023)

David Vaughan OBE
- Born: 23 October 1962; Akrotiri, Cyprus
- Died: 9 February 2023 (aged 60)
- Education: Churchill College, Cambridge (BA); Durham University (MSc); Open University (PhD)
- Scientific career
- Fields: Glaciology
- Workplaces: British Antarctic Survey
- Thesis: Dynamic and climatic influences on Antarctic ice shelves (1995)
- Website: BAS profile

David Glyn Vaughan (23 October 1962 – 9 February 2023) was a British glaciologist and climate scientist who worked at the British Antarctic Survey (BAS).

His research focused on the role of ice sheets in the Earth system and their contribution to sea level rise.

== Early life and education ==
Vaughan was born on 23 October 1962 in Akrotiri, Cyprus. He attended Yateley Comprehensive School and Ivybridge School and Community College. He graduated from Churchill College, Cambridge with a degree in natural sciences in 1984.

He then studied geophysics at Durham University, where he was a member of Hatfield College, receiving an MSc in 1985.

He received his PhD from the Open University in 1995.

== Career and research ==
Vaughan joined the British Antarctic Survey in 1985 and took part in numerous Antarctic field campaigns. His research concentrated on the behaviour of the Antarctic ice sheet and the contribution of melting ice sheets and glaciers to global sea-level rise. He was a coordinating lead author of the Intergovernmental Panel on Climate Change's Fourth Assessment Report.

His research included mapping the subglacial topography beneath Pine Island Glacier, providing new information about the bed on which the West Antarctic Ice Sheet rests. He was also involved in research that identified evidence of a volcanic eruption beneath the West Antarctic ice sheet approximately 2,000 years previously.

From March 2009 to November 2013, Vaughan led Ice2sea, a European Union research programme investigating the contribution of continental ice to future sea-level rise. He served as Director of Science at the British Antarctic Survey from 2014 to 2021.

== Honours ==
Vaughan was appointed Officer of the Order of the British Empire (OBE) in the 2017 New Year Honours for services to glaciology.

== Death ==
Vaughan died from stomach cancer on 9 February 2023, aged 60.
