= Spilhaus Inlet =

Spilhaus Inlet (80°5′S 43°45′W) is an ice-filled inlet which is the southernmost of the three inlets indenting the east side of Berkner Island, Filchner Ice Shelf. Discovered by U.S. ground and aviation personnel from Ellsworth Station (1957–58) under Captain Finn Ronne, USNR. Named by Advisory Committee on Antarctic Names (US-ACAN) in 1988 after Athelstan Spilhaus (b. 1911), meteorologist and oceanographer; member of the U.S. National Committee for the IGY, 1957–58, and of the National Science Board, 1966–72.
