= Seaquist Peak =

Mountain in Antarctica

Seaquist Peak (79°45′S 81°20′W) is a peak, 800 metres (2,600 ft), surmounting the northwest end of the Meyer Hills in the Heritage Range. It was mapped by the United States Geological Survey (USGS) from surveys and U.S. Navy air photos from 1961 to 1966. It was named by the Advisory Committee on Antarctic Names (US-ACAN) for Larry R. Seaquist, a United States Antarctic Research Program (USARP) meteorologist at Ellsworth Station in 1961.
