= Schaus =

Schaus, or Schauß, or Schauss is a German-language surname of Luxembourgian origin. Notable people with the surname include:

== Schaus ==
- Eugène Schaus (1901–1978), Luxembourgian politician
  - Dupong-Schaus Ministry, the government of Luxembourg (1947–1951)
  - Werner-Schaus Ministry I, the government of Luxembourg (1959–1964)
  - Werner-Schaus Ministry II, the government of Luxembourg (1969–1974)
- Fred Schaus (1925–2010), American basketball coach and player
- Hermann Schaus (born 1955), Hessian politician (Die Linke)
- Lambert Schaus (1908–1976), Luxembourgian politician
- Molly Schaus (born 1988), American ice hockey goaltender
- Nick Schaus (born 1986), American professional ice hockey player
- Uli Schaus (born 1951), German handball player
- William Schaus (1858–1942), American entomologist
  - Schausia, a genus of moths named in honor of William Schaus

== Schauß ==
- Ernst Schauß (1906–1972), Hessian politician (FDP)
- Horst Schauß (born 1945), German footballer

== Schauss ==
- Ferdinand Schauss (1832–1916), German painter
- Magdalene Schauss-Flake (1921–2008), German composer and organist

== See also ==
- Schaus Ice Rises, a group of small ice rises in Wilkins Ice Shelf
- Schaus's crow (Euploea blossomae), a butterfly endemic to the Philippines
- Schaus' swallowtail (Papilio aristodemus), a species of American butterfly in the family Papilionidae
