= Beaudoin Peak =

Mountain in Antarctica

Beaudoin Peak (79°48′S 81°0′W) is a snow-free peak, 980 metres (3,200 ft) high, surmounting the southeast part of the Meyer Hills in the Heritage Range. It was mapped by the United States Geological Survey from surveys and from U.S. Navy air photos, 1961–66, and named by the Advisory Committee on Antarctic Names for Douglas W. Beaudoin, United States Antarctic Research Program meteorologist at Ellsworth Station, 1961.

== See also ==
- Mountains in Antarctica
