= Constellation Inlet =

Bay in Antarctica

Coordinates: 78°30′S 80°30′W

Constellation Inlet is an ice-filled inlet, 30 nautical miles (60 km) long and 10 nautical miles (20 km) wide, between the Dott Ice Rise and the Skytrain Ice Rise at the southwest margin of the Ronne Ice Shelf. It was mapped by the United States Geological Survey from surveys and from U.S. Navy air photos, 1961–66, and named by the Advisory Committee on Antarctic Names for the Lockheed Super Constellation aircraft, C-121J. Equipped only with wheeled tricycle landing gear, it was for many years the principal carrier of personnel from the U.S. to New Zealand and thence to the ice runway near McMurdo Station. In addition to its role of hauling men and supplies, the "Connie" flew many hours of aerial photography over Antarctica.
