= Humphreys Ice Rise =

Geologic feature

Humphreys Ice Rise (67°14′S 66°50′W) is an ice rise in the Muller Ice Shelf in the southwestern part of Lallemand Fjord, Loubet Coast, Antarctica. It was photographed from the air by the Falkland Islands and Dependencies Aerial Survey Expedition, 1956–57, and surveyed by the Falkland Islands Dependencies Survey, 1956–59. In association with the names of glaciologists grouped in this area, the feature was named "Humphreys Hill" by the UK Antarctic Place-Names Committee after William J. Humphreys, an American meteorologist and specialist on the effects of ice in the atmosphere. Humphreys was joint author with W.A. Bentley (for whom Bentley Crag was named) of Snow Crystals, New York, 1931. It was renamed as Humphreys Ice Rise to reflect the true nature of the feature.
