= Edward C. Thiel =

Edward C. Thiel (May 4, 1928 – November 9, 1961), was a geologist from the University of Wisconsin and chief seismologist at Ellsworth Station Antarctica, from 1956 to 1958. He was leader of the traverse party that discovered the Thiel Trough submarine valley that was later named in his honor. The Thiel Mountains were also named after him.

Thiel was killed on November 9, 1961, while returning from a geomagnetic survey mission to Mirny Station. The P2V-7 (Bu No.140439) Neptune aircraft from US Navy Squadron VX-6 in which he was a passenger crashed at Wilkes Station in Antarctica, where it had refueled overnight, and was en route back to McMurdo Station.

In 1973 the Thiel Earth Science Laboratory (TESL) at McMurdo Station was dedicated, which was named after him. The Thiel Laboratory later became office for Field Training Safety in the 1990s, after its work moved to the then new Crary lab (Albert P. Crary Science and Engineering Center).
