= Kendrick Taylor =

Kendrick Cashman Taylor, Jr. is a climate change researcher working with ice cores in Greenland and Antarctica. While a Research Professor at the Desert Research Institute in Reno, Nevada, he was the Chief Scientist for the Siple Dome and WAIS Divide ice core projects in Antarctica. He has also done work on near shore clarity at Lake Tahoe and teaching World Vision how to use geophysics to find favorable locations for shallow water wells in West Africa. His ResearcherID is A-3469-2016 and ORCID is 0000-0001-8535-1261.

Kendrick Cashman Taylor, Sr. (1922–1995) was an engineer who specialized in vacuum metallurgy, especially related to depositing thin films on mylar. He is listed as the inventor on the follow U.S.A. patents: US3185565, US3314826, US3278331, US3326177, US3601179, US3215423, US3330900, US3180633, US3554268, US3235243.
