= Gipps Ice Rise =

Gipps Ice Rise (68°46′S 60°56′W) is a roughly elliptical ice rise, 10 nautical miles (19 km) long and bounded by an ice cliff on all sides, lying at the edge of the Larsen Ice Shelf about 35 nautical miles (65 km) northeast of Hearst Island. The feature was discovered by William R. MacDonald of the United States Geological Survey (USGS), December 18, 1966, while on a photographic mapping mission of this area aboard a Super Constellation aircraft crewed by the U.S. Navy VXE-6 Squadron. The ice rise was first mapped from these photos by the USGS. The name was proposed by the UK Antarctic Place-Names Committee for Derek R. Gipps, a Senior Executive Officer with the British Antarctic Survey, 1961–73.
