= Landy Ice Rises =

Landy Ice Rises (72°15′00″S 70°35′00″W) is a group of six ice rises in the Bach Ice Shelf near the head of Stravinsky Inlet, on Alexander Island. They were named by the UK Antarctic Place-names Committee in 1980 after Michael Paul Landy, a British Antarctic Survey glaciologist from 1975 to 1981, who worked in the area from Adelaide station, 1975–76, and Rothera station, 1976–77.
