= Holt Peak =

Mountain in Antarctica

Holt Peak (79°45′S 81°4′W) is a bare rock peak, 850 metres (2,800 ft) high, surmounting the northeast end of the Meyer Hills in the Heritage Range of Antarctica. It was mapped by the United States Geological Survey from surveys and U.S. Navy air photos from 1961 to 1966, and was named by the Advisory Committee on Antarctic Names for William C. Holt, a United States Antarctic Research Program auroral scientist at Ellsworth Station in 1961.

== See also ==
- Mountains in Antarctica
