= Ives Ice Rise =

Coordinates: 71°53′S 73°35′W

Ives Ice Rise is an ice rise about 1 mile (1.6 km) long at the head of Weber Inlet, an ice-filled inlet situated between Bennett Dome and Berlioz Point on the Beethoven Peninsula, situated in the southwest part of Alexander Island in Antarctica. It was mapped by the United States Geological Survey from U.S. Navy aerial photographs taken 1967–68 and Landsat imagery taken 1972–73. In association with the names of composers grouped in this area, it was named by the Advisory Committee on Antarctic Names after Charles Ives, the American composer.

== See also ==
- Dvořák Ice Rise
- Petrie Ice Rises
