= Roberts Inlet =

Roberts Inlet (79°15′S 44°0′W) is an ice-filled inlet, the central of three inlets which indent the east side of Berkner Island. It was discovered by U.S. ground and flying personnel at Ellsworth Station during the International Geophysical Year (IGY) (July 1, 1957–December 31, 1958) under Captain Finn Ronne, USNR. Ronne named it after retired Captain Elliott B. Roberts of the United States Coast and Geodetic Survey Corps, formerly chief of the geophysical branch of the United States Coast and Geodetic Survey and chairman of the U.S. National Committee for the IGY Panel on Geomagnetism.
