= Raymond Effect =

Raymond Effect is a flow effect in ice sheets, occurring at flow divides, which gives rise to disturbances in the stratigraphy, showing unusual arches or anticlines called Raymond Arches. The stratigraphy is detected by radio-echo sounding. The Raymond Effect arises from the unusual flow properties of ice, as its viscosity decreases with stress. It is of importance because it provides field evidence for the flow properties of ice. In addition, it permits dating of changes in ice flow and the establishment of changes in ice thickness. The effect was first predicted by Charles F. Raymond. Raymond Arches and the Raymond Effect have been observed at numerous other ice divides e.g. Siple Dome, Fletcher Ice Rise, Berkner Island, Roosevelt Island, and Korff Ice Rise.

Ice viscosity is stress-dependent, and in zones where the (deviatoric) stresses are low, the viscosity becomes very high. Near the base of ice-sheets, stress is proportional to the surface slope, at least when averaged over a suitable horizontal distance. At the flow divide, the surface slope is zero, and calculations show that the viscosity increases. This diverts ice flow laterally, and is the cause of the characteristic anticlines, which are in effect draped over the high viscosity area.
