= Crary Ice Rise =

Antarctic ice rise

Coordinates: 82°56′S 172°30′W

Crary Ice Rise is an Antarctic ice rise in the south-central part of the Ross Ice Shelf. At 82°56'S, it is the southernmost ice rise. The feature was investigated by the USARP Ross Ice Shelf Project in the 1970s. The name came into use among USARP workers and honors Albert P. Crary (1911–87), American geophysicist.

== See also ==
- Crary Bank
