= Breid Bay =

Bay in Antarctica

Coordinates: 70°15′S 24°15′E

Breid Bay is a bay about 20 nautical miles (37 km) wide, irregularly indenting, for as much as 12 nautical miles (22 km), the ice shelf fringing the coast of Queen Maud Land. This feature was charted and descriptively named "Breidvika" ("broad bay") by H.E. Hansen, as a result of aerial photographs made on February 6, 1937, by the Lars Christensen Expedition of 1936–37.
