= David A. Martin (lawyer) =

American lawyer

- Citizenship: United States
- Education: DePauw University (BA); Yale University (JD)
- Occupations: Lawyer; Professor

David A. Martin is an American lawyer and professor emeritus. He is primarily known for his work on immigration law and has served in various positions for the federal government of the United States, including as general counsel for the Immigration and Naturalization Service and a deputy general counsel for the Department of Homeland Security. He served on the Homeland Security Advisory Council from 2015 until 2018, when he, alongside several other councilmembers, resigned in protest over the immigration policy of the first Trump administration. Since 2016, he has served as a professor emeritus at the University of Virginia School of Law.

== Early life and education ==
Martin was born to Charles Wendell Martin, a member of the Indiana Senate, and grew up in Indianapolis. He earned a Bachelor of Arts from DePauw University in 1970 and a Juris Doctor from Yale Law School in 1975. During his time at Yale University, he served as the editor-in-chief for The Yale Law Journal and additionally served as a law clerk for judges J. Skelly Wright and Lewis F. Powell Jr., with the latter being a justice for the Supreme Court of the United States.

== Career ==
In the late 1970s, Martin spent one year practicing law in Washington, D.C. In 1978, he became a special assistant for an assistant secretary of the United States Department of State in their human rights division. In this position, he worked on matters concerning asylum and immigration issues, with law professor Paul G. Mahoney saying that he did "legislative liaison work" for the Refugee Act of 1980.

In 1980, he became a faculty member for the University of Virginia School of Law. During his time at the university, he published several articles concerning immigration and related topics, with one of his articles being cited by the United States Supreme Court in their 1983 case Immigration and Naturalization Service v. Chadha. Martin was also a fellow of the German Marshall Fund, which allowed him to do research in Geneva, and in 1988, he became the chairman for the Immigration Section of the Association of American Law Schools. In the early 1990s, Martin served as a consultant for the United States Immigration and Naturalization Service, and in 1995, he became the service's general counsel. He served in this role until 1988, after which he returned to the University of Virginia that same year. By 2008, he had become the university's Warner-Booker Distinguished Professor of International Law.

In 2008, Martin participated in the presidential transition of Barack Obama, where he served on the Agency Review Team for the United States Department of Homeland Security. From 2009 to 2010, he served as a deputy general counsel for the Department of Homeland Security under Secretary Janet Napolitano, who had previously been a student of his. For four months of this period, he served as the department's acting general counsel. In 2015, he was appointed to the Homeland Security Advisory Council. That same year, he was awarded the Excellence in International Migration Scholarship Award by the Center for Migration Studies. In 2016, Martin retired from teaching and became a professor emeritus at the University of Virginia.

In 2018, Martin was one of four individuals who resigned in protest from the Homeland Security Advisory Council over disagreements with President Donald Trump regarding his immigration policies. This included the Trump administration family separation policy, a prohibition against immigration from several Muslim-majority countries, increased funding for a Mexico–United States border wall, and attempts by the administration to end Deferred Action for Childhood Arrivals. In a letter accompanying his resignation, Martin wrote, "These actions have fueled polarization, alienated state and local governments, and moved us much further from a sustainable, effective, and strategically sensible immigration enforcement program."

== Publications ==
- “Improving the Exercise of the Attorney General’s Immigration Referral Power: Lessons from the Battle over the ‘Categorical Approach’ to Classifying Crimes,” 102 Iowa L. Rev. Online 1 (2016).
- “Resolute Enforcement Is Not Just for Restrictionists: Building a Stable and Efficient Immigration Enforcement System,” 30 J.L. & Pol. 411 (2015).
- “Why Immigration’s Plenary Power Doctrine Endures,” 68 Okla. L. Rev. 29 (2015).
- Martin, David A. (June 24, 2012). "A lawful step for the immigration system". The Washington Post. ISSN 0190-8286. OCLC 2269358. Archived from the original on September 10, 2014.
