= Ice2sea =

Rapid ice breakup along the Filchner-Ronne Ice Shelf.

Ice2sea was a program of scientific research funded by the European Union's Framework 7 Programme to study the effects of climate change on glaciation and the melting of ice caps and glaciers on sea level. The ice2sea project, a collaborative of 24 research institutions, which was headed by Prof David Vaughan, aimed to reduce the uncertainty in sea-level projections which are of great economic and social importance to European, especially as large areas of coastal Europe are below or less than a metre above sea level.

The 2007 fourth Intergovernmental Panel on Climate Change (IPCC) report highlighted ice sheets as the most significant remaining uncertainty in projections of sea-level rise. Understanding about the crucial ice-sheet effects was “too limited to assess their likelihood or provide a best estimate of an upper bound for sea-level rise”.

Improved scientific results from ice2sea fed into the fifth IPCC report (2013) to generate more accurate sea-level rise projections.

The initiative funded research by scientists from the Alfred Wegener Institute for Polar and Marine Research in Germany, which was published in Nature in 2012, which predicts the disappearance of the 450,000 km^{2} (170,000 sq mi) vast Filchner-Ronne Ice Shelf in east Antarctica by the end of the century which could add up to 4.4 mm (0.17 in) of rise of sea level each year due to its melting alone.

== See also ==
- Sea-level rise
- Antarctic ice sheet
- Greenland ice sheet
- Glaciers
- Intergovernmental Panel on Climate Change (IPCC)
- European Union Framework Programme 7
- British Antarctic Survey
