= Hemmen Ice Rise =

Hemmen Ice Rise (77°57′S 49°46′W) is an ice rise 11 miles (18 km) long and 2 to 4 kilometres (1.2 to 2.5 mi) wide, with an estimated area of 55 square kilometres (21 sq mi), located 17 kilometres (11 mi) off the northwest corner of Berkner Island in the Ronne Ice Shelf, Antarctica. The feature appears for the first time on a chart prepared at Ellsworth Station in 1957 by Captain Finn Ronne, U.S. Navy Reserve. The ice rise was subsequently noted in U.S. Earth Resources Technology Satellite imagery. It was named by the UK Antarctic Place-Names Committee for George E. Hemmen, Executive Secretary of the Scientific Committee on Antarctic Research in 1972; he served with the Falkland Islands Dependencies Survey as a meteorological observer at Admiralty Bay, 1952–53, and as Base Leader at Deception Island, 1953–54, and with the Royal Society Antarctic Expedition, 1956.
