= Mach Schau =

Mach Schau may refer to:

- "Mach Schau", a song by ...And You Will Know Us by the Trail of Dead from their 2003 EP The Secret of Elena's Tomb
- Mach Schau (album), a 2004 album by Hoodoo Gurus
