= Barrett Nunataks =

The Barrett Nunataks (79°20′S 81°24′W) are a group of nunataks located on the east side of the Dott Ice Rise overlooking Constellation Inlet, in the Heritage Range, Ellsworth Mountains. They were named by the University of Minnesota Ellsworth Mountains Party, 1962–63, for Peter J. Barrett, geologist with the party.

The Dott Ice Rise is a peninsula-like feature that is ice-drowned except for the nunataks, about 20 nautical miles (40 km) long, extending eastward from the Heritage Range of the Ellsworth Mountains and terminating at Constellation Inlet at the southwest edge of Ronne Ice Shelf. It was mapped by the United States Geological Survey from surveys and U.S. Navy air photos, 1961–66, and was named by the Advisory Committee on Antarctic Names for Robert H. Dott, a United States Antarctic Research Program geologist and senior U.S. representative at Bernardo O'Higgins Base, summer 1961–62.
