= Triune Peaks =

Mountains in Antarctica

Triune Peaks (69°8′S 66°52′W) are three prominent, sharply pointed rock peaks, rising 12 nautical miles (22 km) northeast of Mount Balfour and overlooking Wordie Ice Shelf on the west coast of Antarctic Peninsula. First roughly surveyed from the ground by British Graham Land Expedition (BGLE), 1936–37. Photographed from the air by Ronne Antarctic Research Expedition (RARE), December 1947. Resurveyed from the ground by Falkland Islands Dependencies Survey (FIDS), November 1958. The United Kingdom Antarctic Place-Names Committee (UK-APC) name derives from the number of peaks in the group.

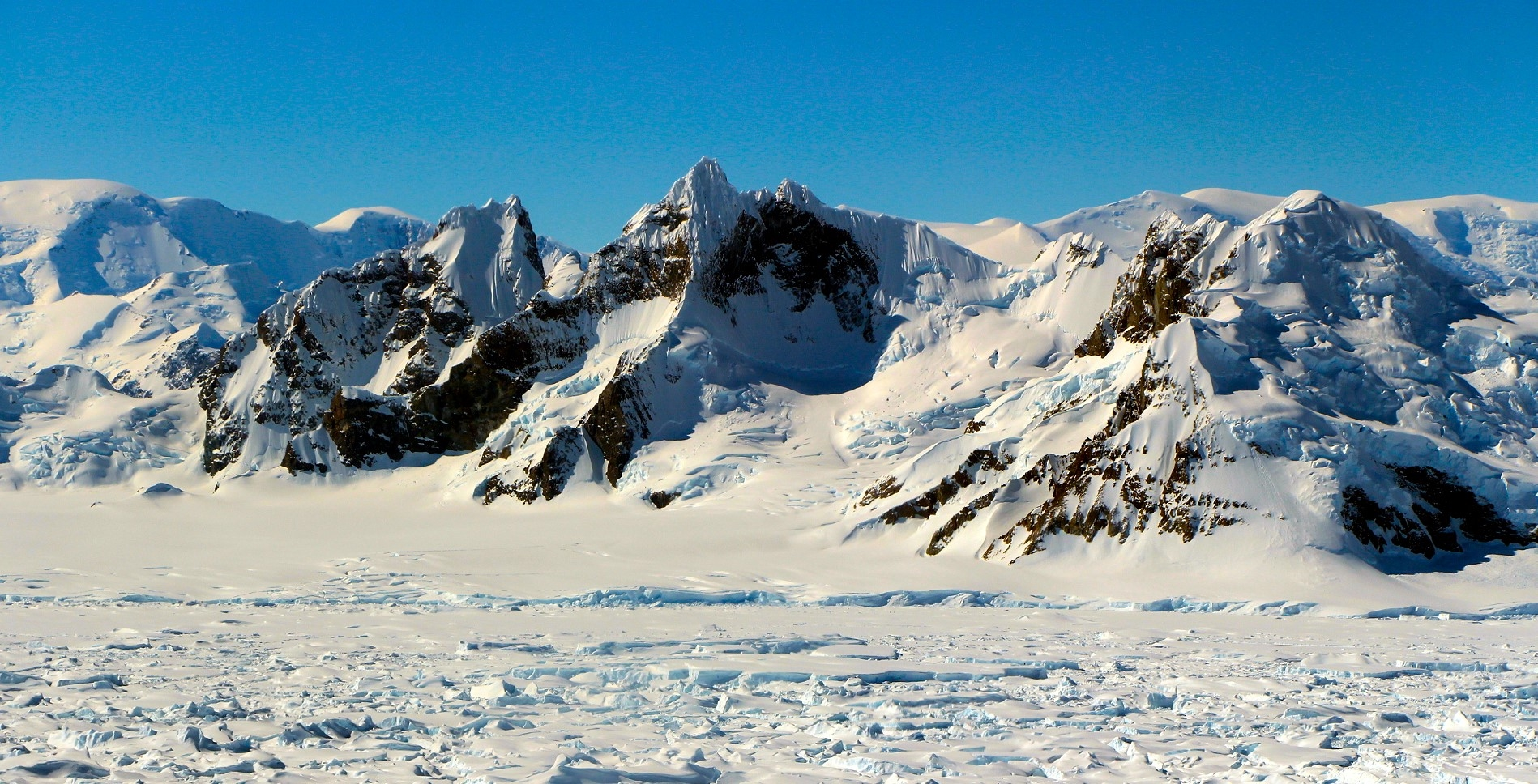
Triune Peaks
