= Skytrain Ice Rise =

Skytrain Ice Rise (79°40′S 78°30′W) is a large, flattish, peninsula-like ice rise of about 50 miles extent, extending from the vicinity of Meyer Hills in the Heritage Range eastward into the Ronne Ice Shelf of Antarctica.

It was mapped by United States Geological Survey (USGS) from surveys and USN air photos, 1961–66, and named by the Advisory Committee on Antarctic Names (US-ACAN) after the LC-47 Douglas Skytrain airplane (also called R4D and Dakota), used extensively in the supply and placement of U.S. field personnel in Antarctica beginning with USN Operation Highjump, 1946–47, and continuing into the late 1960s.

== See also ==
- Korff Ice Rise
