= Daniel C. Martin =

African-American politician

Florida Senate
- In office 1885–1887

Daniel C. Martin was a state legislator in Florida. He represented Alachua County in the Florida State Senate in 1885 and 1887. He lived in the 13th District in Gainesville. A photo of him with other legislators is held in the Florida Archives. He was one of the last African Americans to serve in the state senate.

Martin was a state senator representing Alachua County and served as clerk and treasurer of Gainesville, Florida.

He was photographed with other politicians on the Florida State Capitol steps in Tallahassee in 1885.

== See also ==
- African American officeholders from the end of the Civil War until before 1900
