= Green Ice Rises =

Feature in Antarctic ice

The Green Ice Rises (66°21′S 97°37′E) are a local swelling of the Antarctic ice surface 5 nautical miles (9 km) east of Henderson Island, where the Shackleton Ice Shelf overrides an underlying obstruction. The feature was mapped by Gardner Dean Blodgett (1955) from aerial photography taken by U.S. Navy Operation Highjump (1946–47), and was named by the Advisory Committee on Antarctic Names for Duane L. Green, a radio operator and recorder with U.S. Navy Operation Windmill parties which established astronomical control stations along Wilhelm II, Knox, and Budd coasts in January and February 1948.
