= Mount Balfour (Antarctica) =

Mountain in Antarctica

Mount Balfour (69°19′00″S 67°13′00″W) is a bastion-like rocky mountain, 1,010 metres (3,310 ft) high, which lies at the mouth of Fleming Glacier, close to the junction with the Wordie Ice Shelf on the west side of the Antarctic Peninsula. First roughly surveyed in 1936 by the British Graham Land Expedition under Rymill, and resurveyed by the Falkland Islands Dependencies Survey in 1948. It was named for Henry Balfour, President of the Royal Geographical Society from 1936 to 1938.

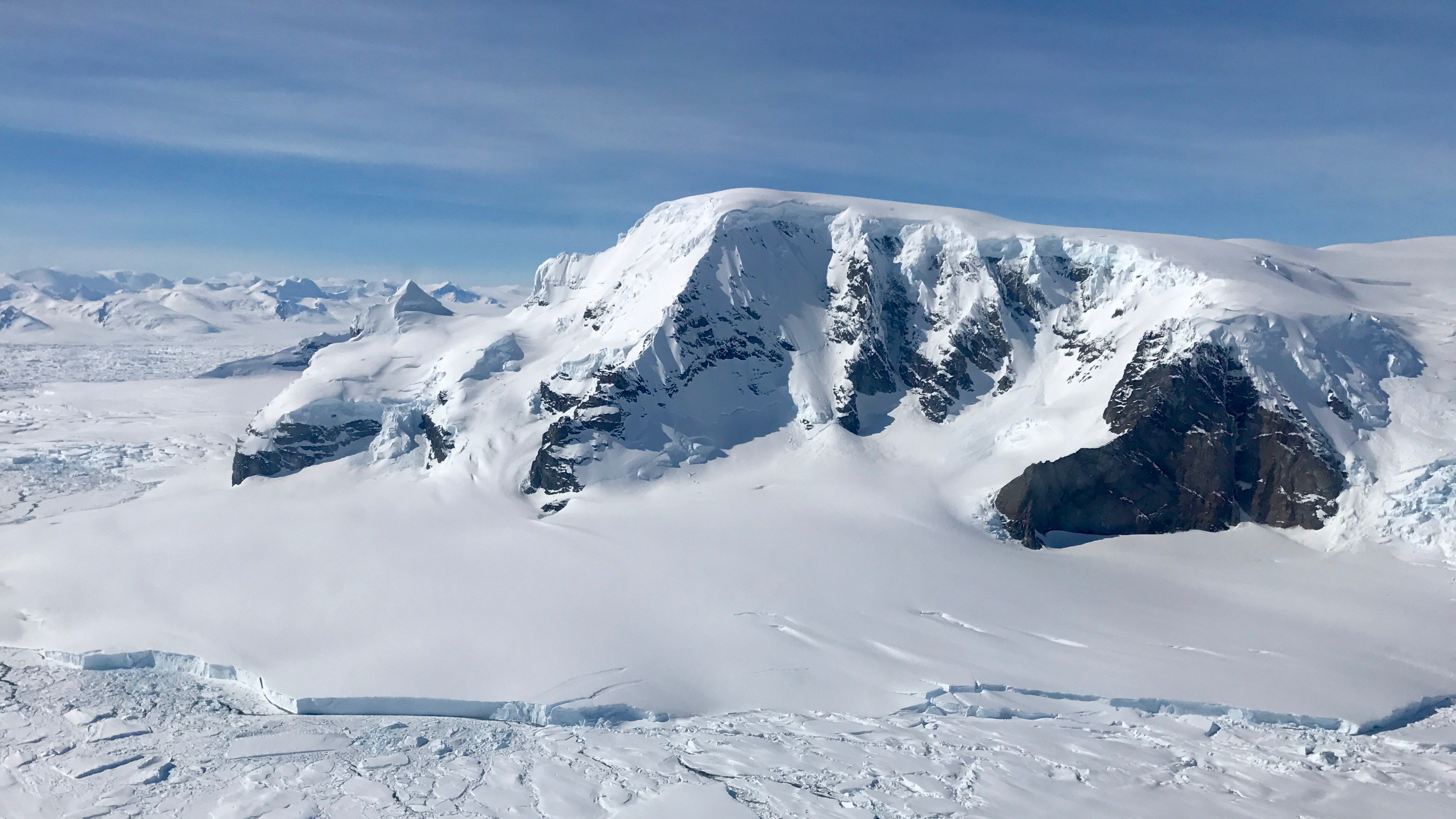
Mount Balfour with Fleming Glacier and tidewater glacier terminus in foreground
