= Martin Ice Rise =

Martin Ice Rise (72°26′S 69°1′W) is an ice rise, 6 nautical miles (11 km) long and 3 nautical miles (6 km) wide, merged within the George VI Ice Shelf and the George VI Sound, located 10 nautical miles (19 km) southwest of Kirwan Inlet, off the east coast of Alexander Island and the west coast of Palmer Land, Antarctica. It was delineated as an ice rise from U.S. Landsat imagery of January 1973, and was named in 1977 by the UK Antarctic Place-Names Committee after Sir David Martin (1914–76), Executive Secretary of the Royal Society, 1947–76, who played a leading role in organizing the Royal Society International Geophysical Year Expedition, 1956–58.

== See also ==
- Dvořák Ice Rise
- Petrie Ice Rises
