= WAIS Divide =

WAIS Divide Camp
- Camp
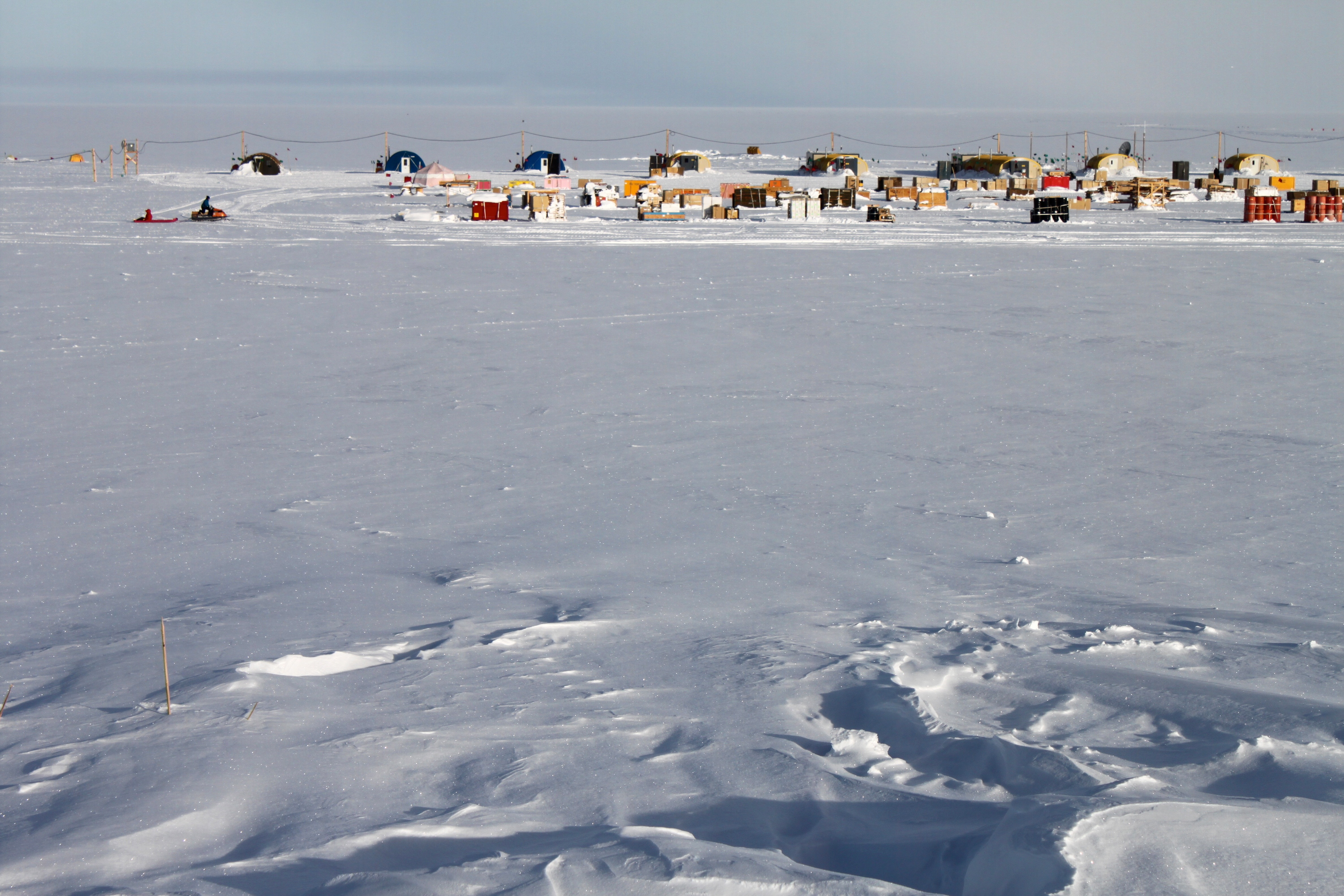
- WAIS Divide Field Camp in 2012

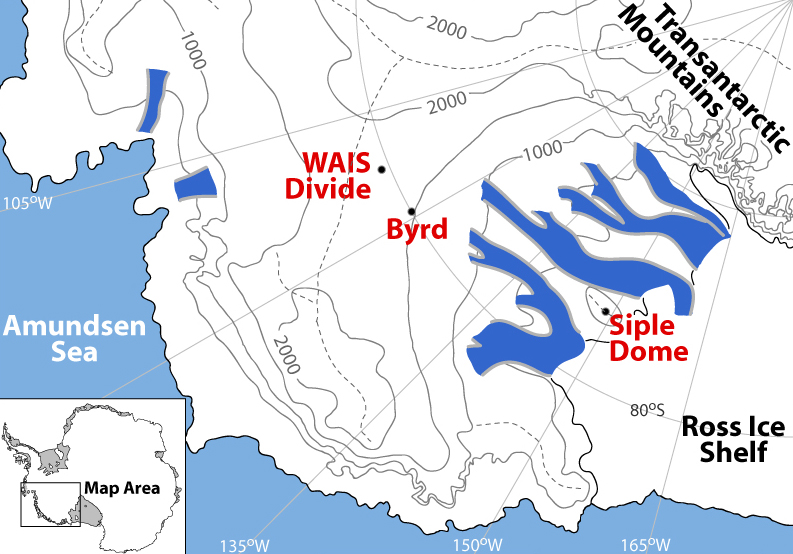
- Detailed map of the WAIS Divide Region
- Coordinates: 79°28′05″S 112°05′10″W
- Country: United States
- Location in Antarctica: WAIS Divide; Antarctica
- Administered by: National Science Foundation
- Established: 2005
- Elevation: 5,896 ft (1,797 m)
- Type: Seasonal
- Status: Operational

WAIS Divide airfield
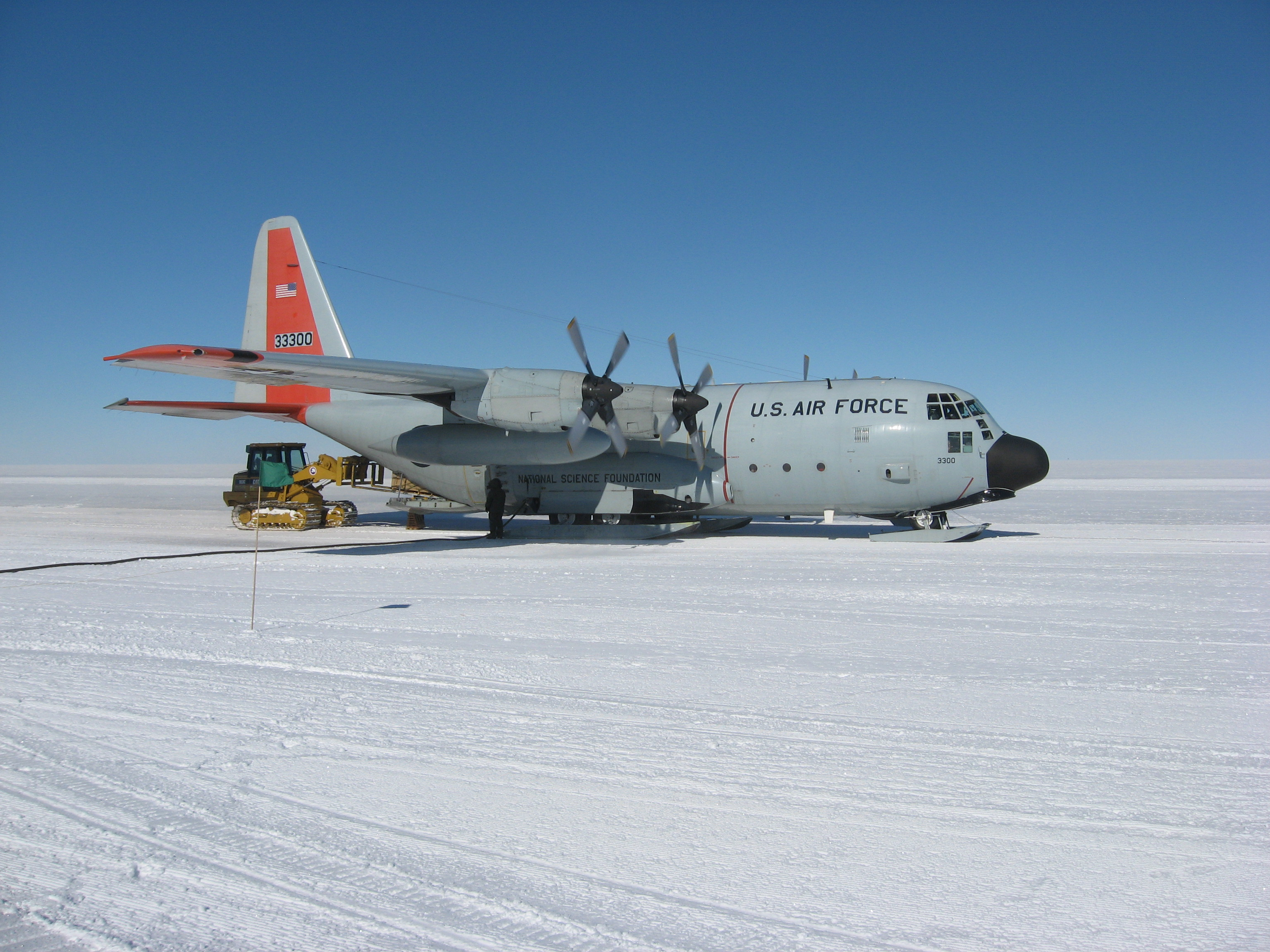
- New York Air National Guard LC-130H being unloaded by a Caterpillar loader at the WAIS Divide field camp.
- IATA: none; ICAO: NWSD

Summary
- Airport type: Private
- Location: West Antarctic Ice Sheet
- Opened: 2005
- Elevation AMSL: 5,895 ft (1,797 m)
- Coordinates: 79°28′25″S 112°04′02″W

Map
- Location of airfield in Antarctica

Runways
| Direction | Length | | Surface |
| Direction | ft | m | Surface |
|---|---|---|---|
| | 11,480 | 3,500 | Snow |

The WAIS Divide is the ice flow divide on the West Antarctic Ice Sheet (WAIS) which is a linear boundary that separates the region where the ice flows to the Ross Sea, from the region where the ice flows to the Weddell Sea. It is similar to a continental hydrographic divide.

== Ice core project ==
The WAIS Divide ice core project (West Antarctic Ice Sheet Divide ice core project) investigated past climate changes, ice sheet dynamics and cryobiology. The project was completed by the United States Antarctic Program (USAP) and was funded by the National Science Foundation (NSF). The focus of the project was to develop records spanning the last ~ 80,000 years of the concentration of greenhouse gases in the atmosphere and Antarctic climate, and to do this with the highest possible time resolution. The project is best known for producing records of atmospheric carbon dioxide and methane with high time resolution and dating accuracy. This was accomplished by collecting and analyzing an ice core from a site named WAIS Divide (79.468° S 112.086° W) that is on the WAIS ice flow divide. This can cause confusion because the name "WAIS Divide" can refer to the WAIS Divide ice flow divide or the WAIS Divide drill site that is at a single spot on the ice flow divide.

=== Project history ===
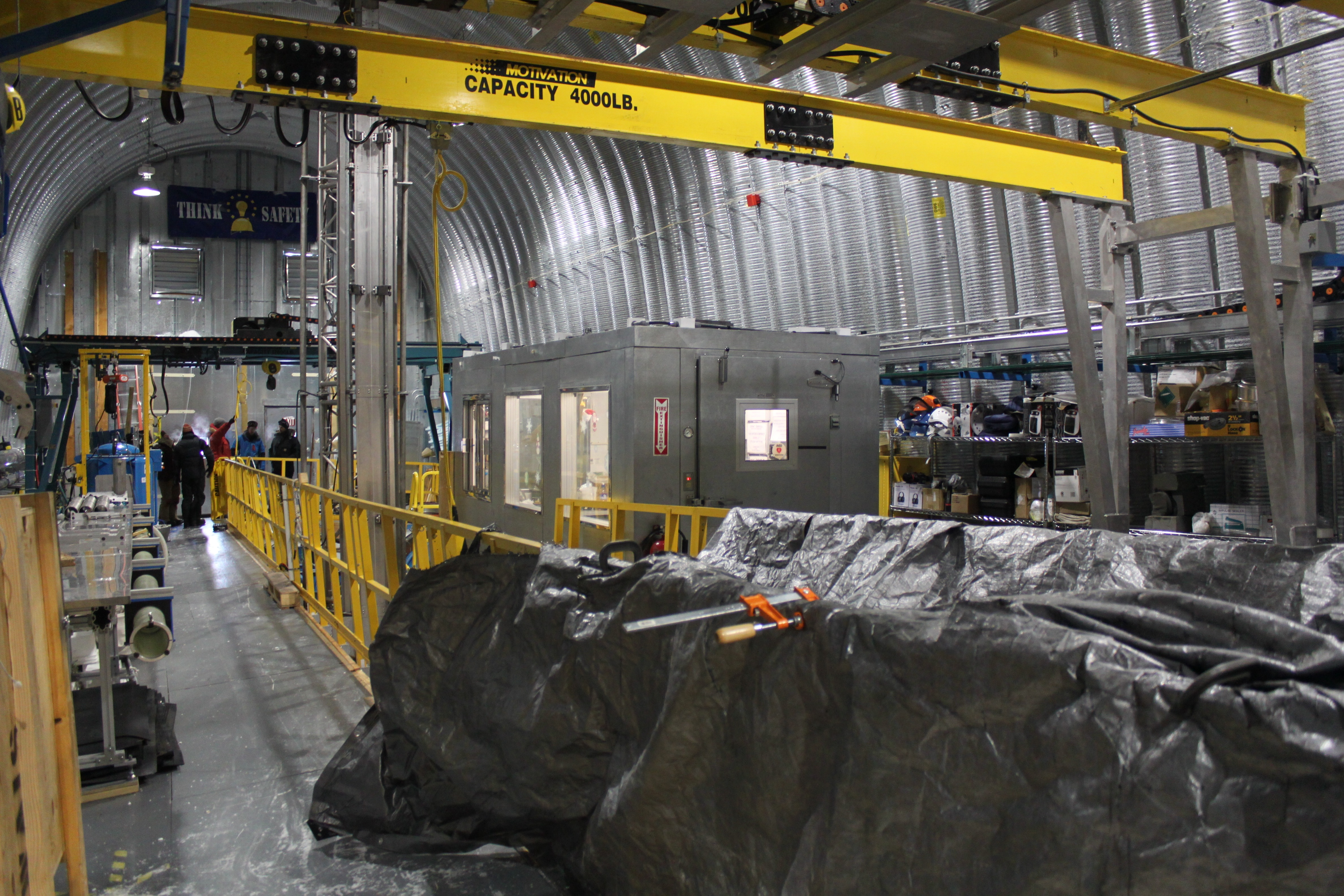
The drilling facilities at the WAIS Divide field camp

Site selection started in 2000 with the goal of finding the best place meeting the following requirements.

- A site in Antarctica was needed because Greenland ice contains enough dust that post-depositional chemical reactions compromise the record of atmospheric carbon dioxide.
- A site with minimal horizontal ice flow was needed to avoid complications caused by different ice deposition locations for ice at different depths. This required drilling on an ice flow divide.
- A site with high annual ice accumulation and thick ice was needed to provide a high time resolution record extending ~80,000 years into the past. This required drilling in West Antarctica which has higher ice accumulation rates than East Antarctica.
- Other requirements included simple basal topography, avoiding the depth interval of brittle ice during the deglacial part of the record, and logistics considerations.

Site preparation started in the 2005/2006 season with the construction of the skiway, and a steel arch shelter for drilling and core processing. Camp logistics was provided by Raytheon Polar Services Company and the air transport by the New York Air National Guard using LC-130 aircraft. The deep coring started in the 2006/2007 season using the Deep Ice Sheet Coring (DISC) drill developed and operated by the Ice Drilling Design and Operations group at the University of Wisconsin, Madison. The coring was stopped in December 2011 at a depth of 3,405 m, which is ~ 50 m above the bottom of the ice sheet. The last 50 m of ice was left in place to provide a barrier between the borehole and the pristine aqueous basal environment. The ice at the bottom of the hole fell as snow 67,748 years ago. In the 2012-2013 season additional core was collected in zones of high scientific interest. This was done by drilling through the side of the main bore hole and coring along a path nearly parallel to the main core.

The ice core was transported to the National Ice Core Laboratory in Denver, Colorado where it was sampled and portions were distributed to 33 institutions for analysis. The analysis included the physical, chemical and isotopic properties of the gases trapped in the ice, the soluble and insoluble material in the melted ice, and the water from the melted ice.

=== Results ===
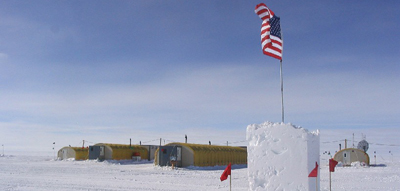
Camp at the WAIS Divide Site

The core was dated using two methods. The top was dated by counting annual layers to an age of 31,200 years ago. The bottom was dated using stratigraphic methods to an age of 67,748, years at the bottom of the core. The dating was more accurate than other Antarctic ice cores and enables a better understanding of the causes of previous climate changes. This information helps improve predictions of future climate changes.

The project developed information on:

- The origins of the abrupt climate changes that occurred during the last ice age.
- The role of variations in the Earth's orbit on climate.
- The natural variations in atmospheric carbon dioxide and the influence of ocean circulation on these variations.
- The natural variations in atmospheric methane and the role of tropical wet lands and ice sheets on these variations.

Paleoceanography will publish a special edition that includes all WAIS Divide related AGU publications as April 2016.

Additional information, including a complete list of all the publications related to the project, is available at: https://waisdivide.unh.edu.

=== Outreach ===
- NOVA: Secrets Beneath the Ice; December 12, 2011.
- Wall Street Journal: Mining for Cold, Hard Facts; May 29, 2010.
- Art installation: WAIS Divide Reliquary, Anna McKee; Nevada Museum of Art, 2016.

=== Project leadership ===
Leadership for the project was provided by the following people:

- Kendrick Taylor, Chief Scientist;
- Matthew Kippenhan, Logistics planning and execution;
- Jay Johnson: Head Driller;
- Mark Twickler: Science Coordination Office Manager;
- Julie Palais, National Science Foundation Program Manager

== See also ==
- Antarctic field camps
- List of airports in Antarctica
