= Korff Ice Rise =

Coordinates: 79°0′S 69°30′W

Korff Ice Rise is an ice rise, 80 nautical miles (150 km) long and 20 nautical miles (40 km) wide, lying 50 nautical miles (90 km) east-northeast of Skytrain Ice Rise in the southwestern part of the Ronne Ice Shelf, Antarctica. It was discovered by the US–IGY Ellsworth Traverse Party, 1957–58, and named by the party for Professor Serge A. Korff, vice chairman of the cosmic ray technical panel, U.S. National Committee for the International Geophysical Year, 1957–59. Radar surveying in 2013-2015 by a team from the British Antarctic Survey found the ice to be up to around 600 metres (2,000 ft) thick and found evidence that the Raymond Effect was operating beneath the ice divide.
