= David Christie Martin =

Sir David Christie Martin CBE FRSE FCS FRIC FRSA DCL (7 October 1914 – 16 December 1976) was a Scottish-born scientific administrator, holding several senior positions.

== Life ==
Martin was born in Kirkcaldy on 7 October 1914 the son of Helen Linton and her husband, David Christie Martin.

He was educated at Kirkcaldy High School then studied at the University of Edinburgh, graduating with a BSc in 1937. Continuing as a postgraduate he gained a doctorate (DSc) in 1939. He then obtained a position as Assistant Secretary of the Royal Society of Arts in London where he remained for the duration of the Second World War. However, he was also seconded to the Directorate of Scientific Research for the Ministry of Supply.

In 1945 he became General Secretary of the Chemical Society. In 1947 he became Executive Secretary of the Royal Society of London under Sir Howard Florey at Burlington House. In 1956 he was elected a Fellow of the Royal Society of Edinburgh. His proposers were James Pickering Kendall, Sir Edmund Hirst, Norman Feather and Sir George Taylor.

He was knighted by Queen Elizabeth II in 1970.

He died at 9 Carlton House Terrace in London on 16 December 1976.

== Family ==
In 1943 he married Jean MacGaradh Wilson. They did not have any children.
