= David Martín (footballer, born 1992) =

Spanish footballer

Personal information
- Full name: David Martín García
- Date of birth: 27 August 1992 (age 34)
- Place of birth: Segovia, Spain
- Height: 1.62 m (5 ft 4 in)
- Positions: Winger; forward

Team information
- Current team: UE Santa Coloma
- Number: 33

Youth career
- 2004–2010: Quintanar Segovia
- 2010–2011: Numancia

Senior career*
Years	Team	Apps	(Gls)
2011–2014	Numancia B	93	(27)
2013–2015	Numancia	8	(0)
2014–2015	→ Tudelano (loan)	24	(0)
2015–2017	Barakaldo	62	(5)
2017–2018	Burgos	36	(1)
2018–2019	Badajoz	39	(6)
2019–2020	Rayo Majadahonda	18	(0)
2020–2022	Andorra	45	(2)
2022–2024	Algeciras	51	(2)
2024–	UE Santa Coloma	34	(5)
- * Club domestic league appearances and goals as of 10 June 2026

David Martín García (born 27 August 1992) is a Spanish footballer who plays as a winger or forward for Andorran club UE Santa Coloma.

== Club career ==
Born in Segovia, Castile and León, Martín began his career with hometown's CD Quintanar Segovia, but later moved to CD Numancia in 2010, making his senior debuts with the reserves in the 2011–12 season. On 17 March 2013 he appeared in his first official game with the first team, a 3–1 home win against Elche CF in the Segunda División championship.

On 22 July 2014 Martín was loaned to Segunda División B's CD Tudelano. Roughly a year later he rescinded with the Rojillos, and signed a one-year deal with Barakaldo CF in the third tier.

Martín subsequently played for third division sides Burgos CF, CD Badajoz, CF Rayo Majadahonda, FC Andorra and Algeciras CF, achieving promotion to the second division with Andorra in 2022.
