= Petrie Ice Rises =

Petrie Ice Rises (70°33′S 72°12′W) is a group of ice rises extending in a north–south line, lying merged within the Wilkins Ice Shelf, to the west of Alexander Island, Antarctica. The group was seen from the air on a British Antarctic Survey (BAS) radio echo sounding flight around Alexander Island on 11 February 1967 and was later accurately positioned from US Landsat imagery. It was named by the United Kingdom Antarctic Place-Names Committee in 1980 after David L. Petrie, a BAS and Scott Polar Research Institute electronics technician (from about 1966–1970), who was on the flight.

== See also ==
- Dvořák Ice Rise
- Ives Ice Rise
- Martin Ice Rise
