= Albert P. Crary Science and Engineering Center =

Coordinates: 77.8500°S 166.6667°E

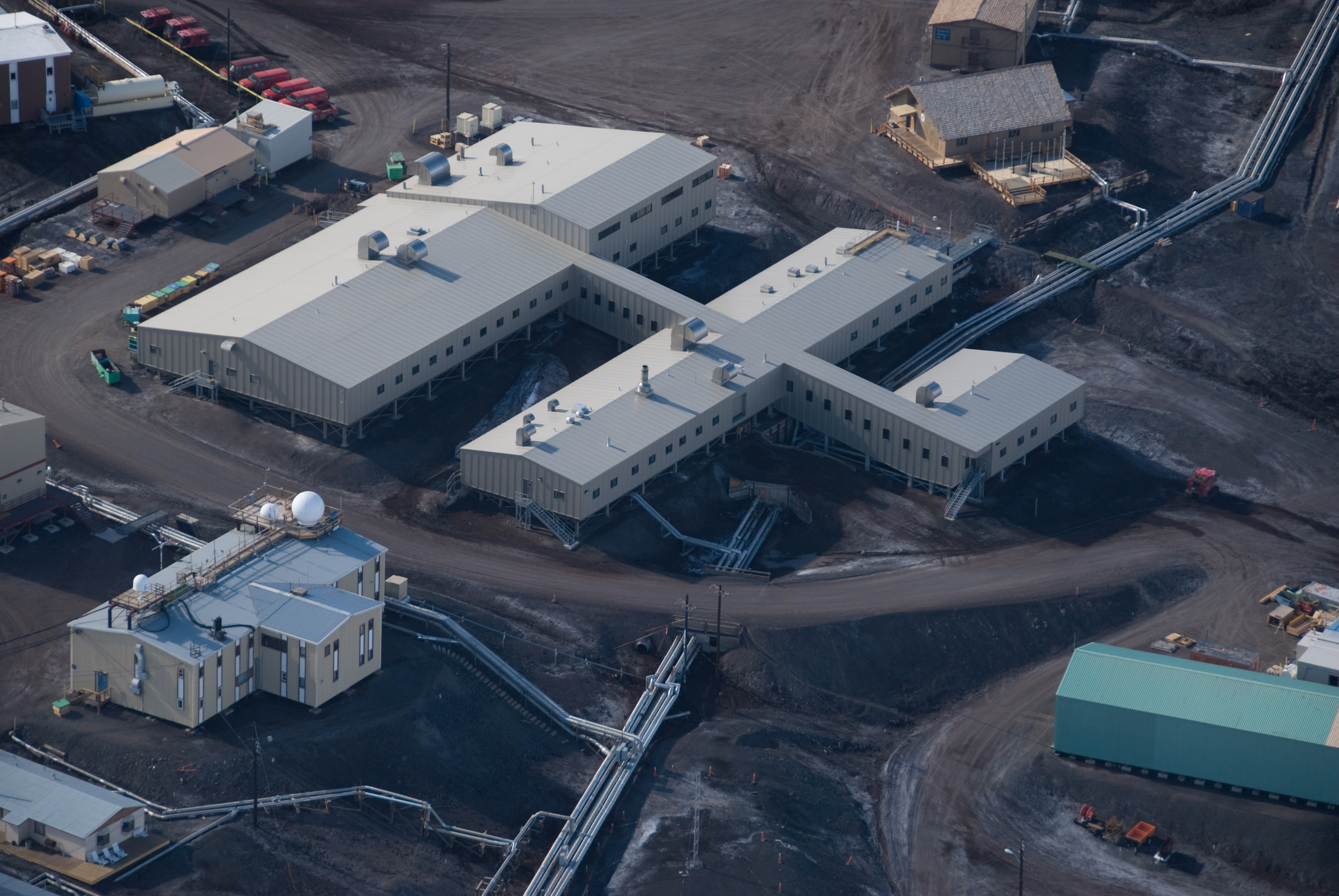
- Interactive map of the Albert P. Crary Science and Engineering Center area

General information
- Status: Active
- Type: Science and engineering center
- Architectural style: Modern
- Location: McMurdo Station, Antarctica
- Named for: Albert P. Crary
- Opened: 1991
- Inaugurated: 1991
- Owner: United States Antarctic Program through the National Science Foundation

Technical details
- Floor count: 2

The Albert P. Crary Science and Engineering Center (CSEC), located at McMurdo Station, was dedicated in November 1991 by the National Science Foundation (NSF). The laboratory is named in honor of geophysicist and glaciologist Albert P. Crary. There are five pods making for 4,320 square meters of working area that includes a two-story core, a biology pod, earth sciences and atmospheric sciences pods, and an aquarium. CSEC was built to replace older, outdated science buildings that were built as early as 1959.

Crary is known for its salt-water touch tank, with sealife from nearby McMurdo Sound.

== Facilities ==
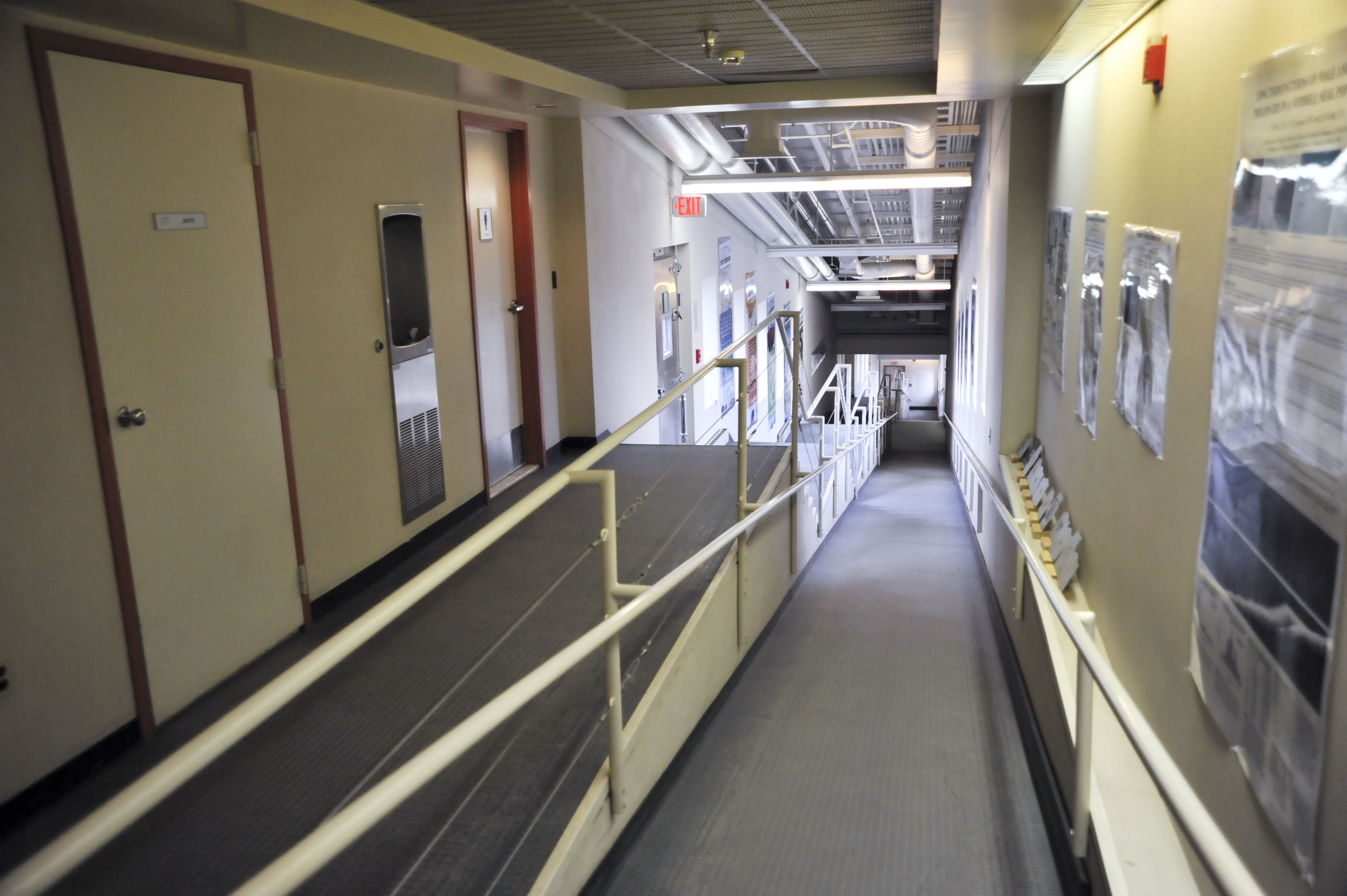
Interior of CSEC, with its sloped central hallway

The second floor of CSEC has a computer room, a library, and classrooms.

== Activities ==
The CSEC conducts research on aeronomy and astrophysics, biology and medicine, geology and geophysics, glaciology and glacial geology, and ocean and climate systems.

Crary has a salt-water touch tank, where active visitors can touch sea life.

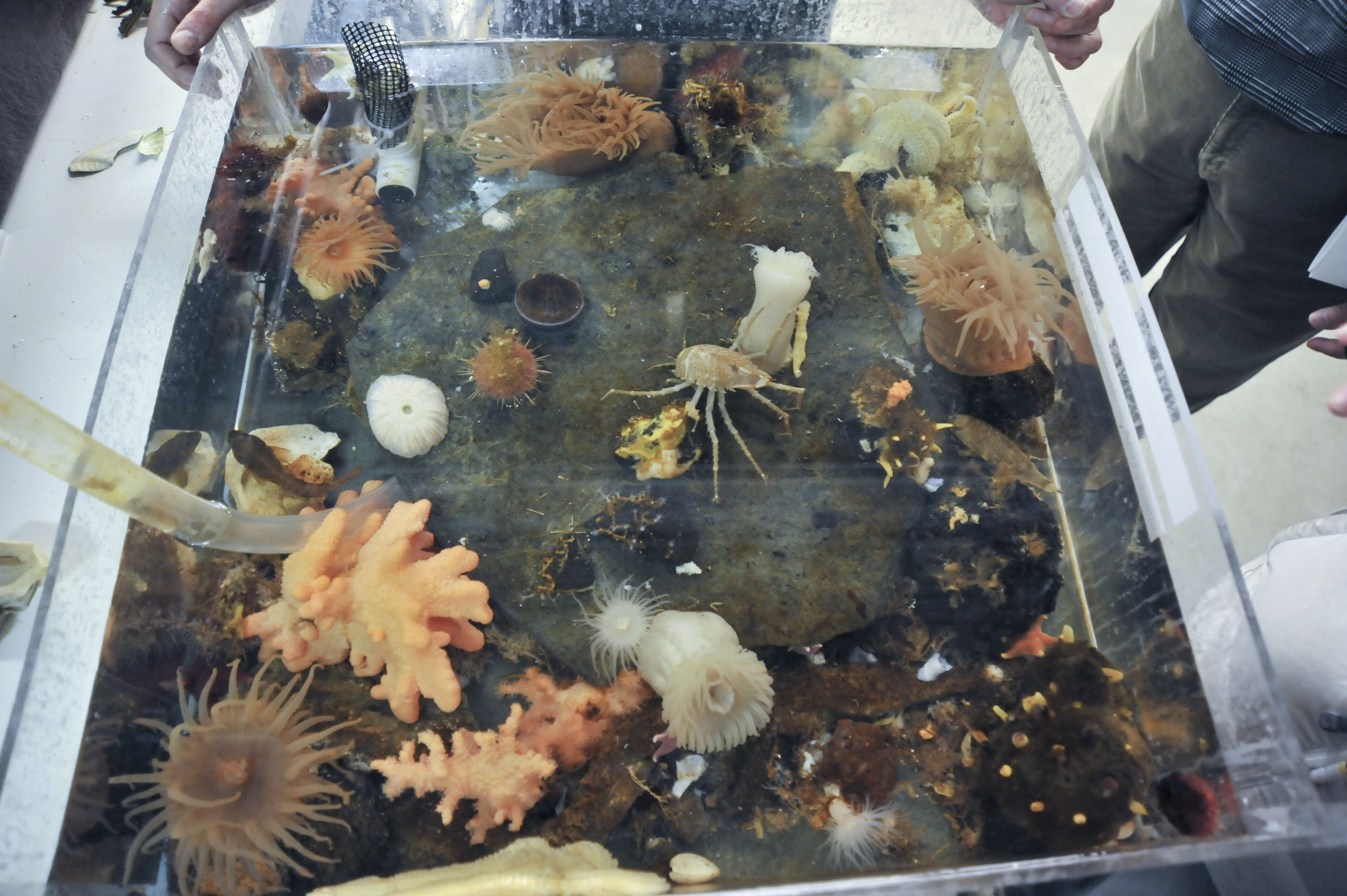
Salt water touch tank at Crary
