= Dvořák Ice Rise =

Dvořák Ice Rise (71°21′S 72°46′W) is an ice rise 1.5 nautical miles (3 km) in extent, rising above the ice of Mendelssohn Inlet in the southwest part of Alexander Island, Antarctica. It was first mapped, from air photos taken by the Ronne Antarctic Research Expedition, 1947–48, by D. Searle of the Falkland Islands Dependencies Survey in 1960, and was named by the UK Antarctic Place-Names Committee after Antonín Dvořák, the Czech composer. (1841–1904).

== See also ==
- Martin Ice Rise
- Petrie Ice Rises
