= Ice divide =

Boundary on an ice sheet, ice cap or glacier separating opposing flow directions of ice

An ice divide is the boundary on an ice sheet, ice cap or glacier separating opposite flow directions of ice, analogous to a water divide. Ice divides are important for geochronological investigations that use ice cores, since such coring is typically made at highest point of an ice sheet dome to avoid disturbances arising from horizontal ice movement. Ice divides are used for looking at how the atmosphere varied over time. Coring at dome peaks increases precision of reconstructions as it is the place where horizontal motion is at its least. The Raymond Effect operates at ice divides, creating anticlines in the radar-detected isochrones, allowing greater capture of older ice when coring.

Analysis of ice cores relies on the downward motion of ice, trapping changes of atmospheric gases through time into its layers. Scientist locate ice divides and take ice cores from them, which are typically long cylindrical poles of ice, and analyse them to find chemical elements that the snow and ice transported during that period, e.g. sulfate, nitrate, and other ions. Ice cores are important in determining how our atmosphere has changed, and how we can remedy changes such as the greenhouse effect; scientists found more greenhouse gases were in our atmosphere at present than in the past.

Scientists from around the United States came together to find the best ice divide in order to go further into the past. They founded the WAIS project, which is funded by the United States National Science Foundation, and is run by scientists from many organizations e.g. National Ice Core Laboratory, Ice Drilling Design and Operations (IDDO), and over fifty universities. The WAIS project is located in West Antarctica, and the goal is to look into the evolution of the Antarctic ice sheet and climate over the past 100,000 years. The West Antarctic Ice Sheet (WAIS) is better than other ice divides because of the amount of snow it gets, which means that the layers of ice are thicker. This larger layer thickness means there is a smaller off-set between the ages of the ice and that of the air and gases trapped inside, allowing scientists to make more precise statements about how the atmosphere varied in the past. The success of the WAIS project has educated scientists around the world as to how the atmosphere of Earth has changed dramatically over 100,000 years.
