= Berkner Island =

Ice rise in the British Antarctic Territory, Antarctica

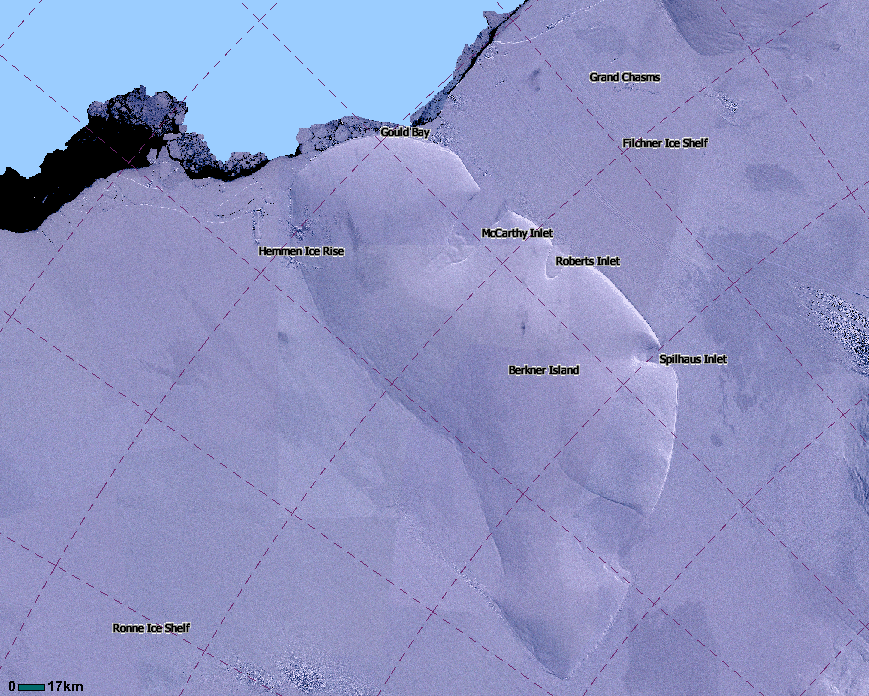
- LIMA Satellite image of Berkner Island, Antarctica

- Location of Berkner Island in the Filchner-Ronne Ice Shelf

- Location within Antarctica

Geography
- Location: Antarctica
- Coordinates: 79°30′S 47°30′W
- Area: 44,000 km^{2} (17,000 sq mi)
- Area rank: 31st
- Length: 320 km (199 mi)
- Width: 150 km (93 mi)
- Highest elevation: 869 m (2851 ft)
- Highest point: Thyssenhöhe

Administration
- Administered under the Antarctic Treaty System

Demographics
- Population: 0 (2000)

Berkner Island (also known as the Berkner Ice Rise or as Hubley Island) is an Antarctic ice rise, where bedrock below sea level has caused the surrounding ice sheet to create a dome. If the ice cap were removed, the island would be underwater. Berkner Island is completely ice-covered and is about 320 kilometres (200 mi) long and 150 kilometres (93 mi) wide, with an area of 44,000 km^{2} (17,000 sq mi). It is surrounded by the Filchner-Ronne Ice Shelf. The northernmost point of the Berkner is about 20 kilometres (12 mi) from the open sea. It lies in the overlapping portion of the Argentine and the British Antarctic territorial claims.

The island rises to 869 m (2,850 ft) (975 m or 3,200 ft, according to other sources) and separates the Ronne Ice Shelf from the Filchner Ice Shelf. It is characterized by two domes, Reinwarthhöhe in the north (698 m or 2,290 ft), and Thyssenhöhe in the south (869 m or 2,851 ft). It is indented by three bays on the eastern side, which are, from north to south, the McCarthy Inlet, the Roberts Inlet, and the Spilhaus Inlet. The southern tip is named the Mulvaney Promontory. Gould Bay is on the north coast. Berkner Island is about 150 km (93 mi) west of Luitpold Coast, Coats Land, the closest mainland of Eastern Antarctica. The Hemmen Ice Rise is 17 km (10.6 mi) off the northwest corner of Berkner Island.

== History ==
Berkner Island was discovered by members of the United States-International Geophysical Year party from Ellsworth Station during the 1957–1958 season. It was named by the United States Advisory Committee on Antarctic Names after American physicist Lloyd Berkner, engineer with the Byrd Antarctic Expedition (1928–1930).

Since 1990, Berkner Island has been a jumping-off point for a number of long-distance polar expeditions. Ben Saunders has planned an unsupported journey from the island to the South Pole and back, and it was the start point of Henry Worsley's attempt to cross the Antarctic in 2015–16.

In the 1994–1995 field season, the British Antarctic Survey (BAS), Alfred Wegener Institute and the Forschungsstelle für Physikalische Glaziologie of the University of Münster cooperated in a project drilling ice cores on the North (Reinwarthhöhe) and South (Thyssenhöhe) Domes of the island. Between 2002 and 2005 a 948 meters (3,110 feet) core was drilled through to the bed at Thyssenhöhe by a team from BAS and the Laboratoire de Glaciologie et Géophysique de l’Environnement, Grenoble, and radar work in 2005 and 2010-11 confirmed the existence of the Raymond Effect.

== Important Bird Area ==
A 500 ha site on fast ice 5 kilometers (3.1 miles) north of the area where the Ronne Ice Shelf joins the north-western coast of Berkner Island, about 90 kilometers (56 miles) to the northwest of Gould Bay, has been identified as an Important Bird Area by BirdLife International because it supports an emperor penguin colony. The size of the colony was estimated as about 8,000 individual birds, based on 2009 satellite imagery.

== See also ==
- Composite Antarctic Gazetteer
- List of Antarctic islands south of 60° S
- SCAR
- Territorial claims in Antarctica
