= Wordie Ice Shelf =

Ice shelf in Antarctica

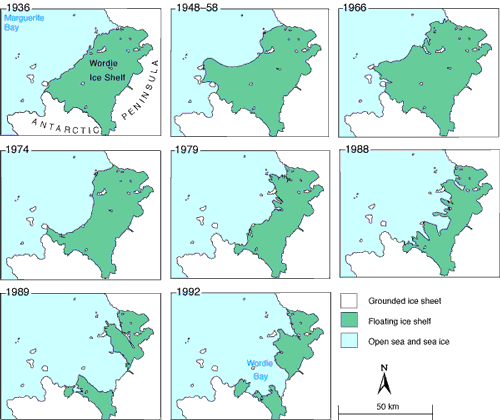
Diagram showing breakup of Wordie Ice Shelf over several years

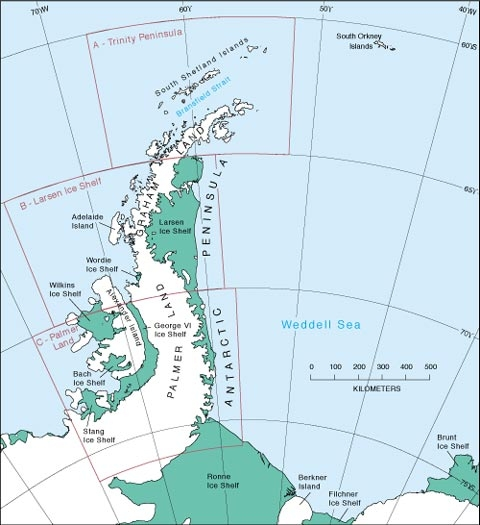
Location of Wordie Ice Shelf within the Antarctic Peninsula

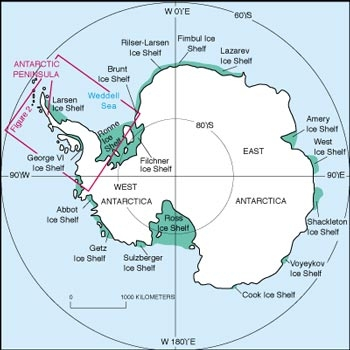
Location of Antarctic Peninsula within Antarctica

The Wordie Ice Shelf (69°15′S 67°45′W) was a confluent glacier projecting as an ice shelf into the SE part of Marguerite Bay between Cape Berteaux and Mount Edgell, along the western coast of Antarctic Peninsula.

In March 2008, the British Antarctic Survey reported that it appeared ready to break away from the Antarctic Peninsula. By April 2009 it had done so, vanishing completely.

Discovered by the British Graham Land Expedition (BGLE) under Rymill, 1934–37, who named this feature for Sir James Wordie, Honorary Secretary (later President) of the Royal Geographical Society, member of the Discovery Committee, and chairman of the Scott Polar Research Institute. He also had been geologist and Chief of the Scientific Staff of the British expedition, 1914–16, under Ernest Shackleton.

== See also ==
- List of Antarctic ice shelves
