= Percy Correll =

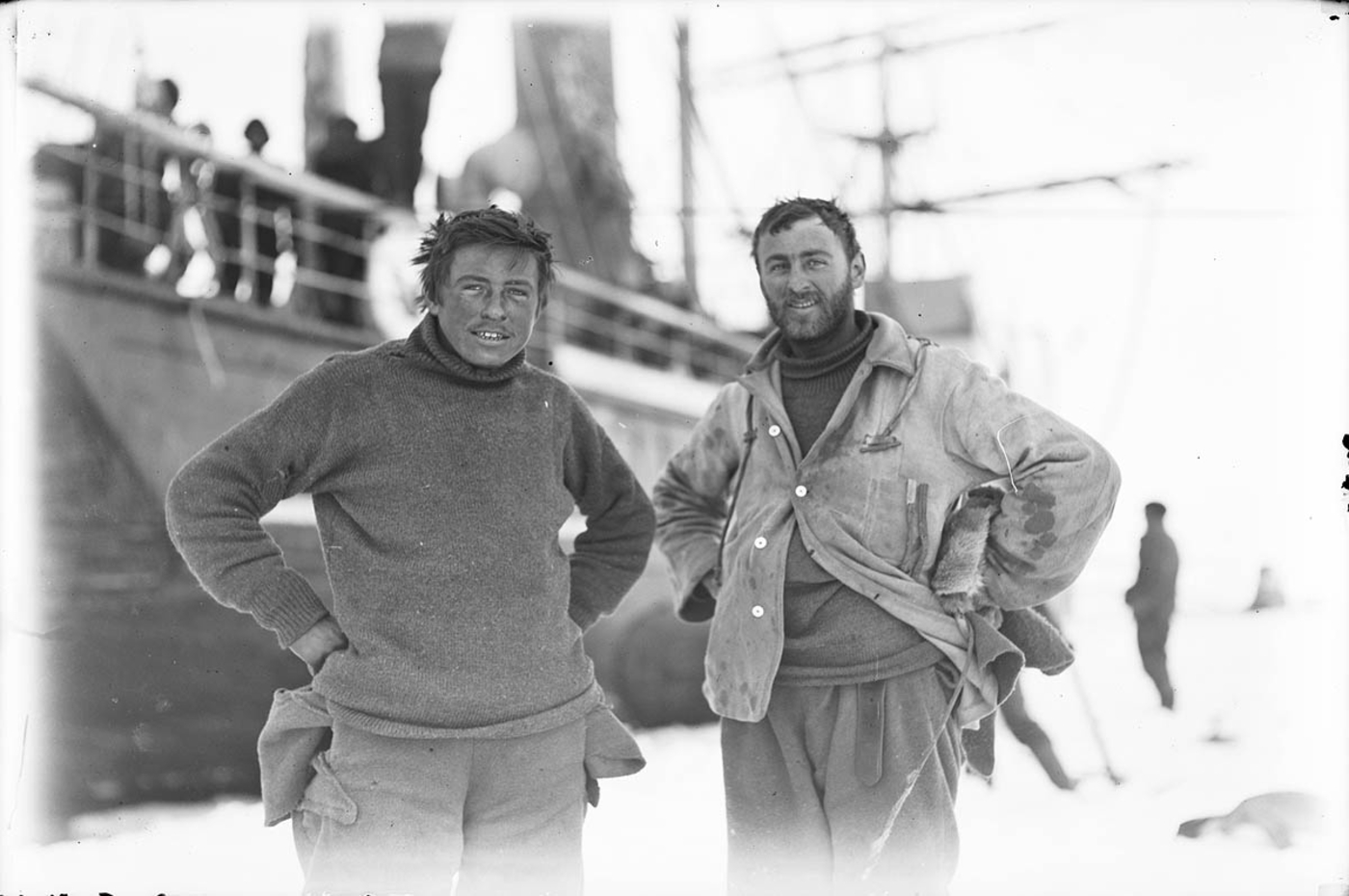
Correll (left) with Charles Laseron

Percy Correll (1892–1974) was a mechanic and an assistant physicist on Sir Douglas Mawson's scientific expedition to Antarctica from 1911–1914, the Australasian Antarctic Expedition.

== Biography ==
Percy Edward Correll (also known as Percival) was born in 1892 in Adelaide, and died on 11 June 1974. He was cremated at Centennial Park Cemetery, Adelaide.

=== Australasian Antarctic Expedition ===
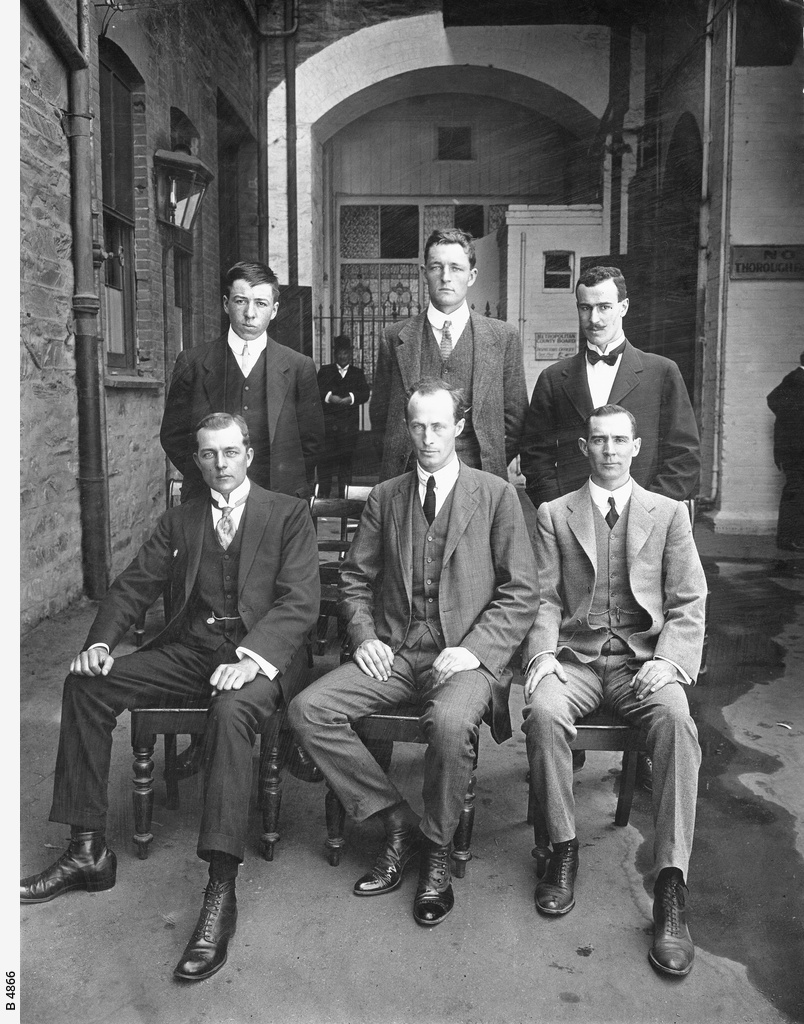
Back Row: Correll, Cecil Madigan and Frank Bickerton. Front row: Alfred Hodgeman, Mawson and Morton Moyes

Correll was 19 years old and a science student at the University of Adelaide when he was selected to join Mawson's expedition. He was selected as a mechanic and as assistant to wireless operator Walter Hannam. He took part in the Eastern Sledging journey with Cecil Madigan and Archibald McLean, exploring the coast near the Mertz Glacier. They were instructed to explore this area taking detailed records of magnetic, biological, topographical, meteorological and geological observations, as well as details of the surfaces including sastrugi and record distances and heights.

The group left Cape Denison on 8 November 1912, reached their farthest point on 18 December 1912, and returned to base camp on 16 January 1913. Their return was delayed one day past their deadline due to blizzard conditions on their return which slowed their progress. During their trek the group explored the Mertz and Ninnis glaciers, travelled over dangerous stretches of coastal ice and glaciers, climbed Aurora Peak and reached Horn Bluff. They kept detailed records of geological features and mapped the environment as they travelled.

Correll left the main base on SY Aurora in February 1913 along with most of the expedition, while a smaller group stayed behind awaiting the return of the Far Eastern Party (comprising Mawson, Xavier Mertz and Belgrave Edward Sutton Ninnis). During the return trip, he acted as colour photographer. He returned to Adelaide in March 1913.

Correll Nunatak is named after him.

=== Patents ===
Correll applied for a number of patents including:

- Process for embellishing glass
- Improvements in light projectors including head lamps for vehicles and the like
- Improvements in the Construction of Tent
- Improvements in the Construction of Headlamps for Vehicles
- Improvements in and relating to "screens" and "sheets" and the like for the reception of optically-projected pictures, images and the like
