= Correll Nunatak =

Nunatuk in Antarctica

Correll Nunatak (67°35′S 144°14′E) is a nunatak lying within the western part of Mertz Glacier, about 13 nautical miles (24 km) south of Aurora Peak. It was discovered by the Australasian Antarctic Expedition (1911–14) under Douglas Mawson, who named it for Percy E. Correll, a mechanic with the expedition.
