= Dogs of the Australasian Antarctic Expedition =

Sledge dogs working on the Australasian Antarctic Expedition in 1912

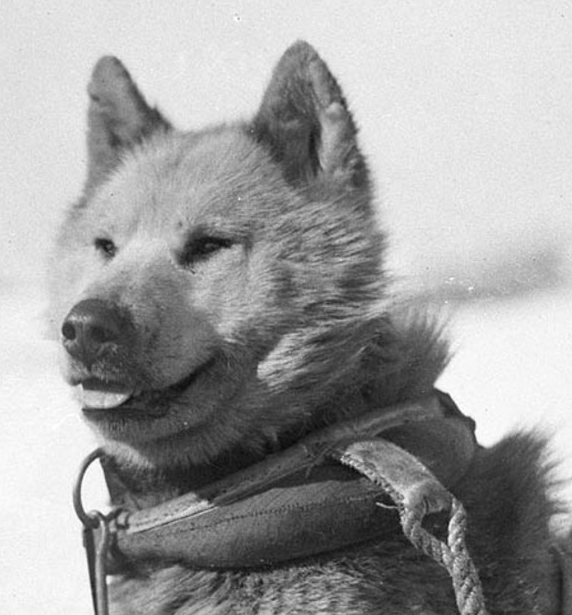
One of the twenty-one dogs donated to the Australasian Antarctic Expedition by Roald Amundsen for its unplanned second season in Antarctica

In common with many of the expeditions of the Heroic Age, Douglas Mawson's Australasian Antarctic Expedition (AAE) employed dog-hauled sledges as a principal means of transportation during exploration of the continent. Dog sledges could carry more weight and travel faster than man-hauled sledges; they were more reliable in the freezing temperatures than motor-sledges; and dogs had proved to be more adaptable to harsh Antarctic conditions than ponies.

Mawson purchased fifty sledge dogs from Greenland and transported them to Antarctica on the expedition's ship SY Aurora. The trip was arduous for the dogs and by the time the expedition arrived in Antarctica on 8 January 1912 only 28 of the dogs were still alive. These were split into two groups: nineteen stayed with Mawson at the expedition's main base and the remaining nine were sent with Frank Wild to the western base. All of the original dogs at the main base were dead by the end of 1912; accidents and illness had accounted for many of them and some were killed and eaten when food ran out on Mawson's main sledging journey. At the western base two dogs survived to accompany the party home.

Three pups had survived at the main base and their numbers were supplemented by 21 dogs donated to Mawson by Roald Amundsen on his return from the South Pole. Eleven of Amundsen's dogs were shot almost immediately to conserve the food supplies. During the year another dog was attacked by his companions and had to be destroyed, and the only bitch died during an operation. One puppy was born though, so twelve dogs were picked up with the party at the end of 1913.

The dogs were put briefly into quarantine in Adelaide Zoo and then a number were adopted by members of the expedition. Two were donated to the zoo, and the remaining dogs were sent to Kosciuszko National Park where they joined the surviving dog from the western base pulling sledges for visitors.

== Dogs on polar expeditions ==
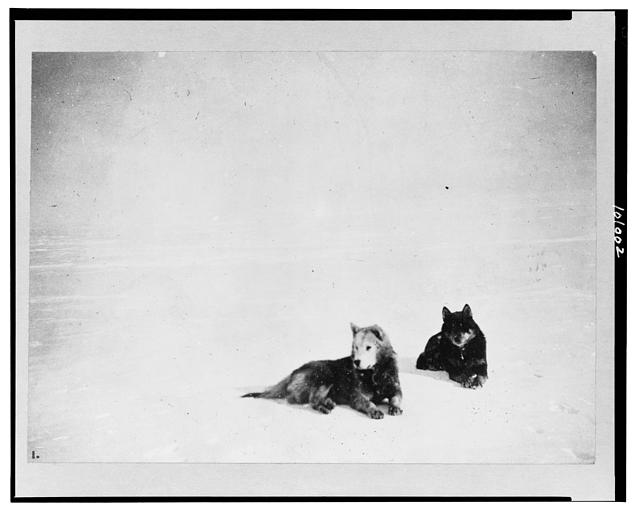
Fix and Lassesen, two of Amundsen's dogs. Fix would later be given to Mawson for his second season.

Douglas Mawson, the leader and organizer of the Australasian Antarctic Expedition, decided to take fifty Greenland Dogs with him; he believed that number would be more than sufficient for the exploratory sledge journeys that he was planning to undertake during the year he planned to spend in Antarctica. Mawson favoured dogs over ponies because, although they could only pull a little more than their own body weight, their food could be supplemented with meat from the fauna of Antarctica and – if necessary – from other dogs, so they did not need the vast imports of fodder that ponies required to see them through an expedition. Mawson had been impressed by the enthusiasm of the dogs on the Nimrod Expedition when he had accompanied Ernest Shackleton to Antarctica. Both Shackleton and Robert Falcon Scott were dubious of the advantage of dogs over ponies. Amundsen and the Arctic pioneer Fridtjof Nansen were passionate advocates and thought the British explorers had misunderstood how to employ dogs in the polar regions; Amundsen pointed to their successes in the Northern Hemisphere and the relative ease of handling dogs compared with ponies, especially in heavily crevassed areas where a fallen dog could often be easily retrieved but a fallen pony was usually lost. The Norwegians were thoroughly utilitarian in their approach to dogs though; although they could be affectionate with the animals, there was little thought given to their survival when they had outlived their usefulness. Scott had used dogs on his Discovery Expedition and had felt it badly when he had been forced to kill them all during his southern sledging journey. Nevertheless, his attitude towards dogs was similar to Amundsen's and Mawson's:

One cannot calmly contemplate the murder of animals which possess such intelligence and individuality, which have frequently such endearing qualities, and which very possibly one has learnt to regard as friends and companions. On the other hand, it may be pointed out with good reason that to forego the great objects that may be achieved by the sacrifice of dog-life is carrying sentiment to undue length. It is a case, if ever there was one, where the end justifies the means. There is no real reason why the life of a dog should be considered more than that of a sheep, and no one would pause to consider the cruelty of driving a diminishing flock of sheep to supply the wants and aid the movements of travellers in more temperate climes. — Robert Falcon Scott, The Voyage of the Discovery

== Voyage to Antarctica ==
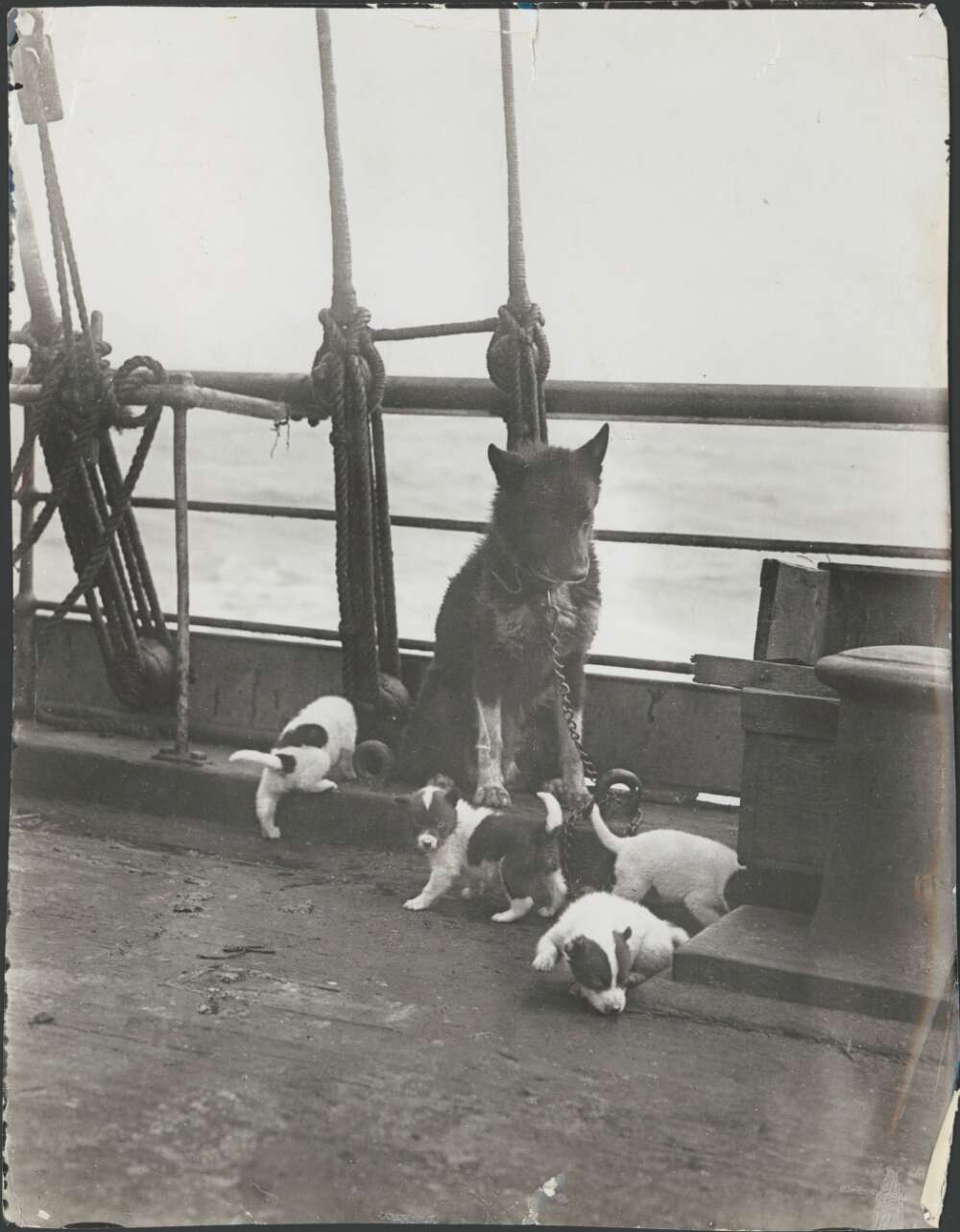
Ginger and her pups on board Aurora during the voyage to Hobart. The pups did not survive.

With the help of C. A. Bang and the Royal Danish Geographical Society in Copenhagen, Mawson procured fifty dogs from Greenland in July 1911. As Bang was not a dog expert, Mawson made sure Ernest Joyce, the dog handler from Shackleton's Nimrod Expedition, was on hand to assist him. One of the dogs went missing in Greenland while waiting to be transported, but it was replaced and the dogs were shipped to Copenhagen. Unfortunately, Wilhelm Filchner had also ordered dogs from Greenland for his Antarctic expedition and the two sets of dogs were delivered as a single group. The Germans arrived first to collect their consignment and initially selected all the best dogs, but when Joyce arrived he insisted that they should be divided more fairly. By the time the dogs were ready to travel to England three pups had been born, swelling the number to 53, but en route to London one of the adult dogs was lost.

On arriving in London on 17 July 1911, they were placed in quarantine at Spratts Dog Home in Surrey until Aurora, the expedition's ship, was ready to sail on 27 July. One dog and one pup died at Spratts. Travelling with the 48 remaining dogs and two pups from London were two members of the expedition, Belgrave Sutton Ninnis and Xavier Mertz, who had been appointed dog-handlers despite having no previous experience. From the start, discipline among the dogs on board Aurora was maintained by frequent "thrashings".

Aurora went first to Cardiff arriving on 31 July and after four days set out for Cape Town on 4 August. On the day of the sailing Ninnis recorded that they had lost a pregnant bitch but the two pups were still well. The voyage to Cape Town was hard on the dogs and, although there were frequent litters born, few of the pups survived for any time; at least 27 pups died between leaving Cardiff and arriving at Cape Town on 27 August. The adult dogs suffered too and by the time the ship docked in South Africa the two best breeders, Peggy and Hilda were having seizures. They were diagnosed as having distemper and chorea and both died on 28 September the day after the ship had put out from Cape Town.

Five more dogs and at least four pups died between the ship leaving South Africa on 27 September and arriving in Australia on 4 November, (Note: The dogs lost were: Jack's Brother, Mordkin, Nelson and two unnamed dogs. The pups were: Teddy Bear, Togo and two which had not yet been named.) as the fits that had affected Peggy and Hilda became more common. Though Ninnis and Mertz wanted to vary the dogs' diet they had little to feed them other than biscuit and were unable to devise a regimen that prevented or decreased the symptoms. Aurora's captain, John King Davis, had intended to get a stock of fish before leaving Cape Town as a supplement for the dogs' diet, but Mertz made no mention of this addition when he was interviewed after the dogs had arrived in Tasmania.

In Hobart, the dogs (accompanied by Ninnis and Mertz) were put into quarantine until the expedition was ready to depart. Mawson had intended that they start their training during their stay in Hobart, but quarantine was strict and nothing seems to have come of this plan. At the quarantine station – on a better diet, in less harsh conditions, and able to exercise – most put on weight and their condition improved, but the seizures and deaths continued. Vets and inspectors were unable to agree on a diagnosis or prescribe for the illness, and five more dogs including Hooker, one of the early pups, died during the month they spent in quarantine. (Note: The dogs lost were: Jumbo, Nigger, two unnamed dogs and the pup, Hooker.) On 2 December 1911, the remaining 36 dogs and two pups were loaded back aboard, and Aurora set sail first for Macquarie Island and then Antarctica. The ship arrived at Macquarie on 12 December and the dogs were let off under the care of Ninnis while the wireless relay station was established. The sealers working on the island helped secure the dogs and killed some elephant seals to feed them:

We stretched a rope along the beach and they tied the dogs in sets of four along the rope. We got our gear out and killed a couple of elephants and flensed the blubber and flesh off to feed the dogs. We cut it off in about 80 to 100 lbs pieces and threw one piece to each four dogs. They were just like a pack of wolves tearing at it. — Livingstone, one of the sealers

On 23 December most of the dogs were re-embarked; one which had proved itself vicious was abandoned.

The mysterious seizures continued to cause deaths among the dogs as the expedition approached its destination; seven more dogs died. The expedition's medical officers, Sydney Jones and Archibald Lang McLean, determined the cause to be gastroenteritis in the majority of cases. (Note: The dogs lost were: Jack, Ross, King Lear, Jeffries, Pollux, Lady Hamilton and Charcot)

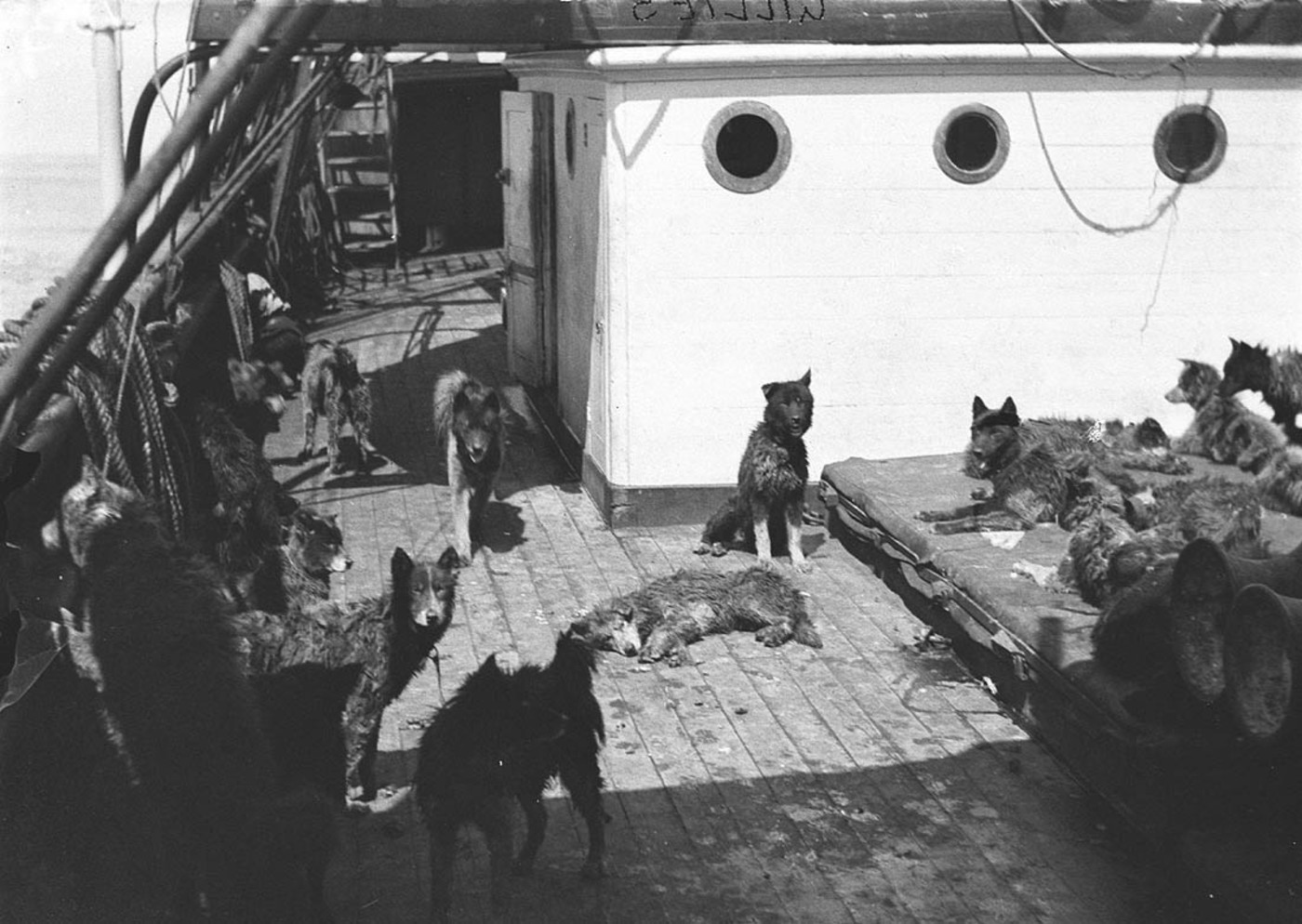
The dogs on first boarding Aurora in London

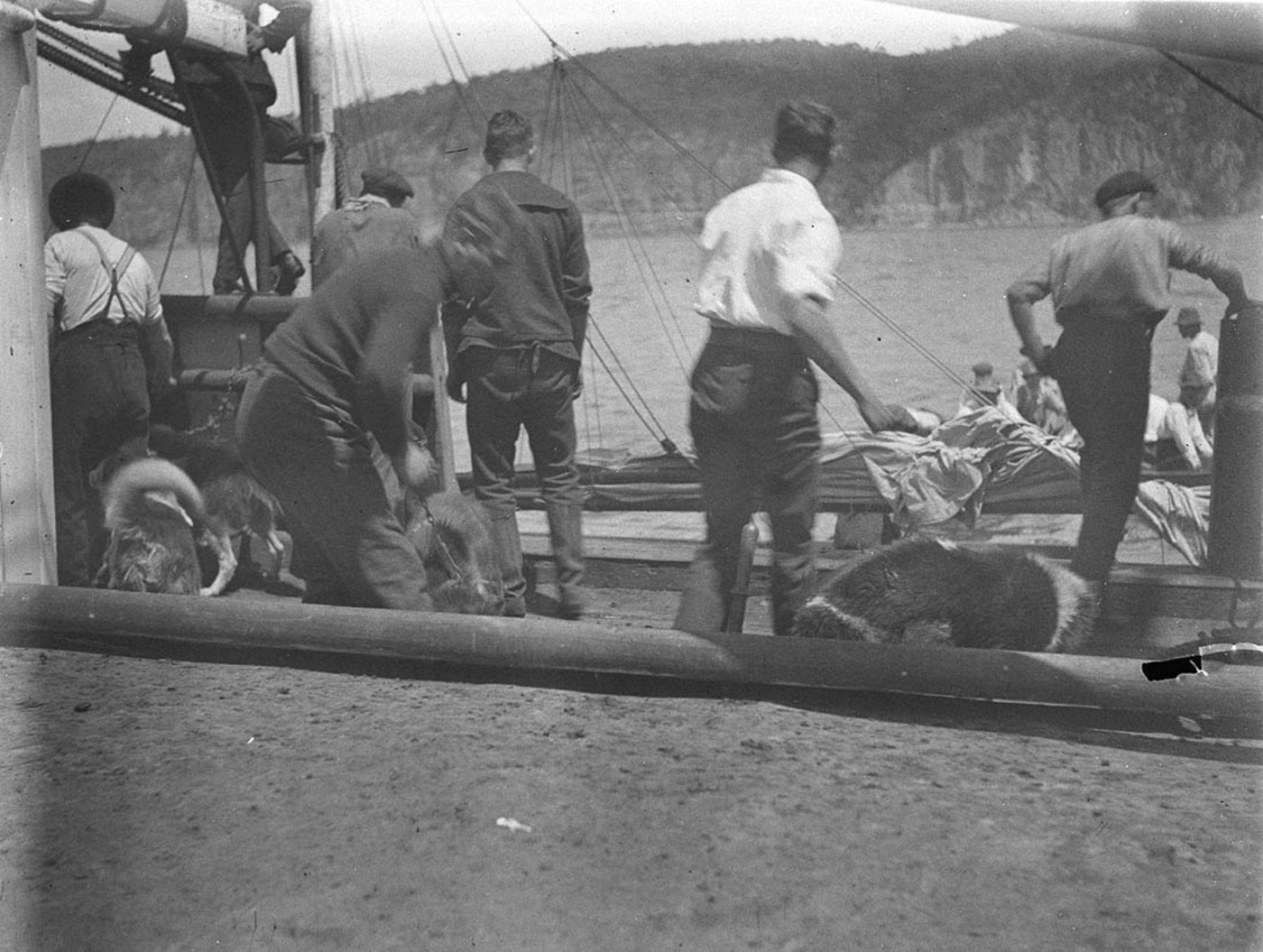
Getting the dogs on board after their stay in quarantine in Hobart

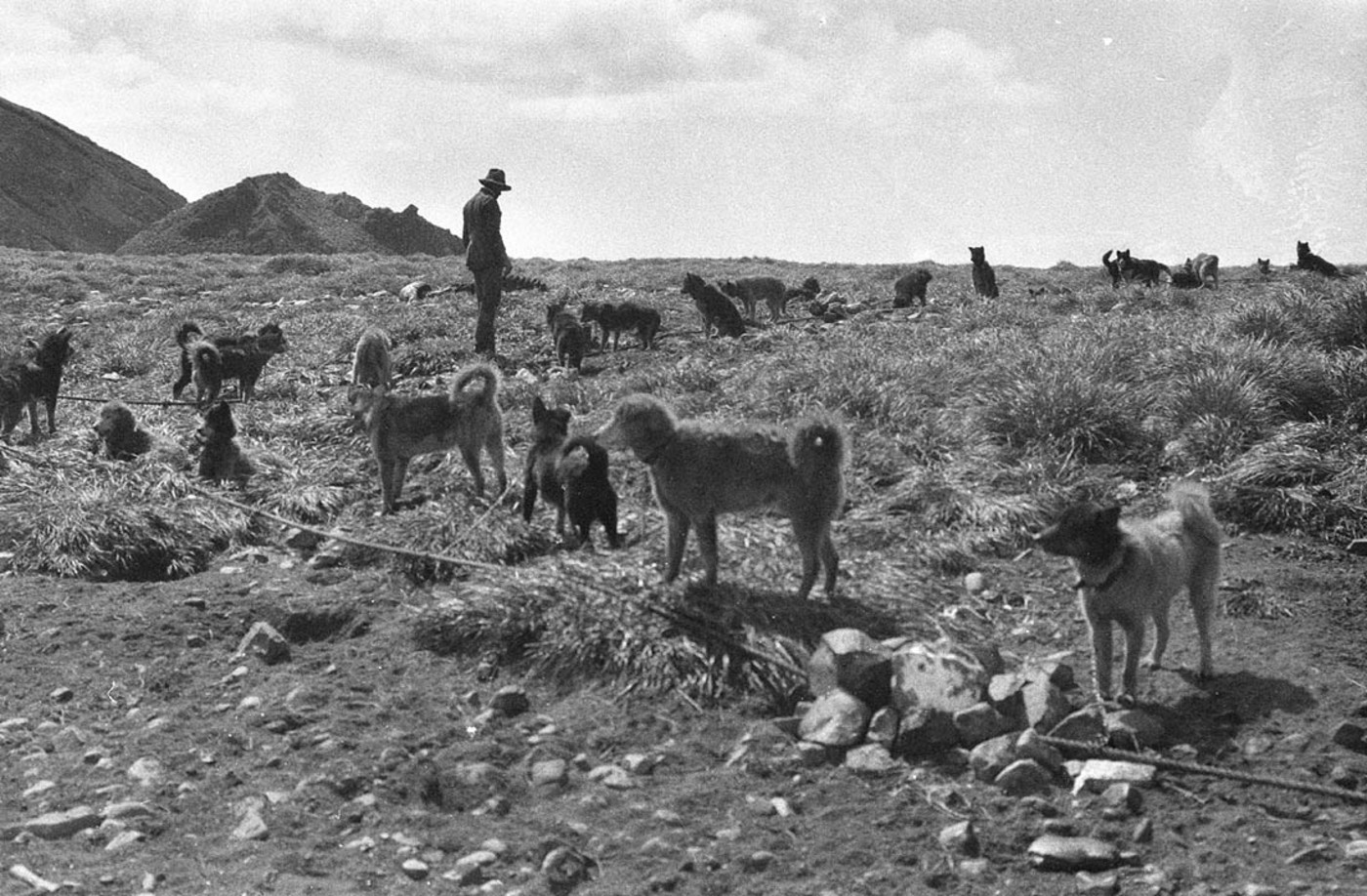
The dogs tethered out during their brief stay at Macquarie Island while on the journey south

== Main base ==
=== First season, 1912 ===
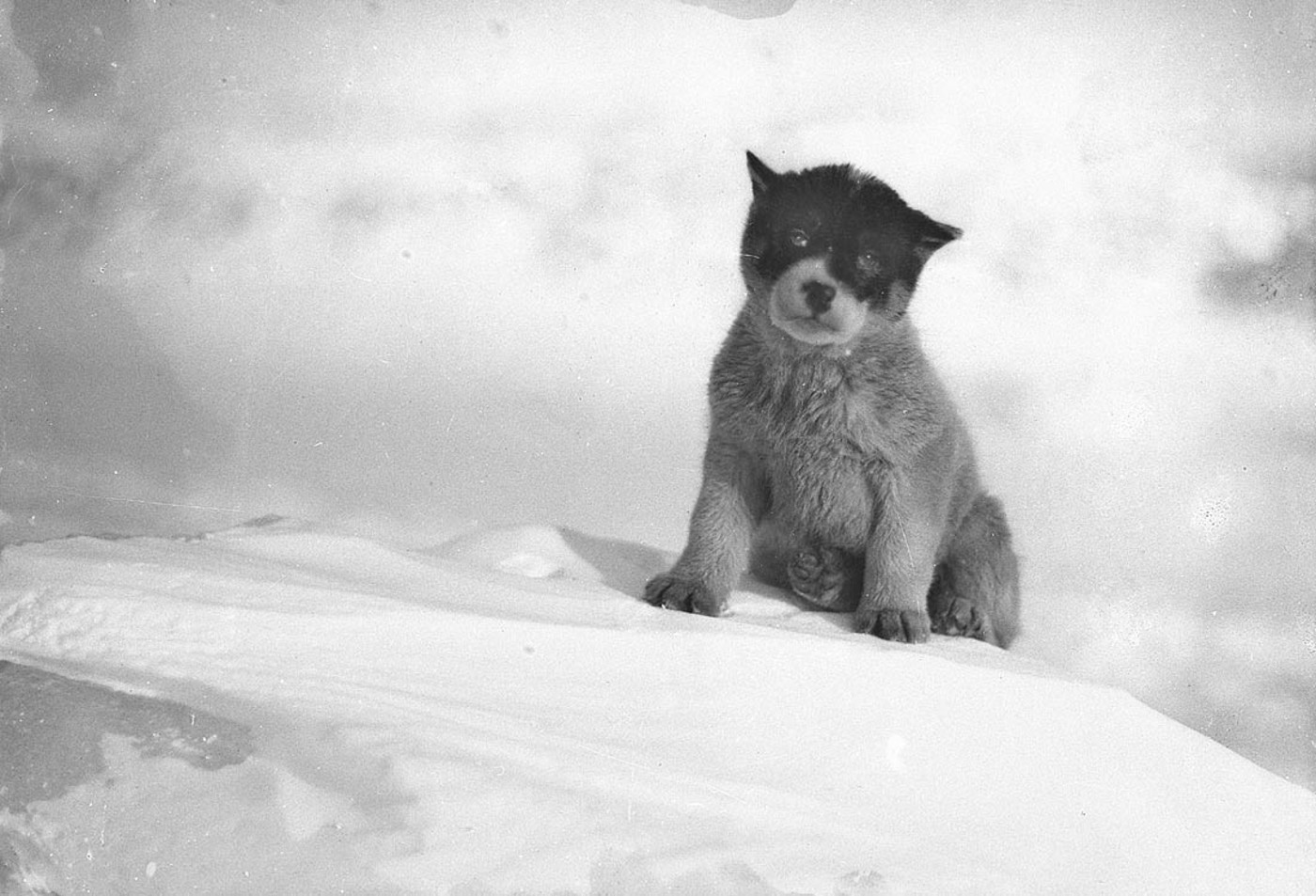
Blizzard, the only pup that survived to adulthood in the first year

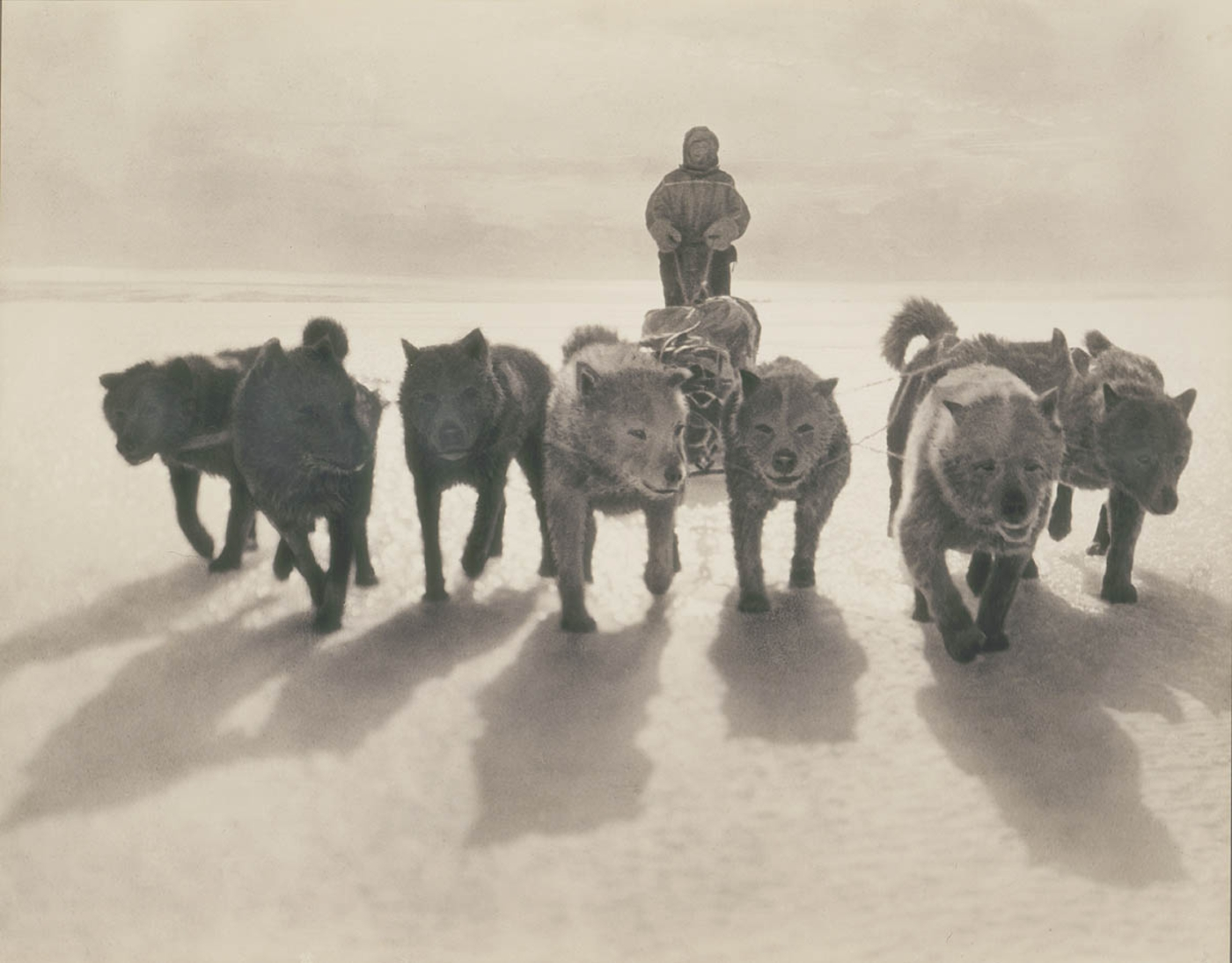
Dogs in harness pulling Ninnis

By the time Mawson decided to make his main camp at Cape Denison on 8 January 1912, there were 29 adult dogs left on board. One of these, Mrs Bruce, died during the time the ship was being unloaded and the main base established, and her pup died on 11 January when it was accidentally washed overboard by the crew. Mawson and Frank Wild agreed that 19 of the remaining dogs would stay at the main base and 9 would accompany Wild and his party as they sailed west to set up a second base.

At Cape Denison the dogs initially fared well. Although the winds were fierce and blizzards frequent, the dogs seldom suffered unless the temperatures were well below zero; some of the stronger dogs were quite happy to sleep outside even when the conditions were severe enough to keep the men trapped in the huts. When the conditions became too extreme the dogs were brought in to the "verandah", a partially enclosed passage outside the door of the hut, or into the hangar. In July conditions deteriorated to such an extent that even though the dogs had been taken into the verandah, they were still often found frozen to the ground – Mawson noted "They whine piteously for they can't move".

A hierarchy among the dogs was quickly established. Basilisk, who was "quick as lightning when it came to a scrap", became the leader, Ginger Bitch (originally and officially called Alexandra) was his constant companion, and Shackleton was next in line as top dog. Another dog, Jack Johnson – named after the boxer – was constantly testing himself against the other dogs, he had heavy scarring as result.

There was little attempt to control breeding; any pups that survived to adulthood would be useful additions to the sledge teams. Pups were born regularly, but few survived more than a few days; they were either eaten by their mothers, killed by the other dogs, or perished in the harsh conditions. It was not until March 1912 though that the first casualty occurred among the immigrants. On 7 March Mawson recorded that one of the dogs, Caruso, had been found with a cord wound tightly round his neck. McLean operated on him. Although the wound was deep and over a 1 foot (30 cm) long, his condition initially improved, but after a few weeks he deteriorated and on 30 March he had to be shot. On 28 June McLean accidentally mixed some broken glass into the dog's food. Mawson was anxious about them but they did not appear to experience any ill effects.

Mawson planned for a number of sledging parties to set out as soon as the weather allowed. The work outside the camp mostly involved laying up stores in supply depots in preparation for these journeys. Serious training for the dogs was underway by June and progressed well. In hauling the supplies out to the depots the dogs were invaluable; six dogs could pull a sledge with a load of 1,000 pounds (450 kg). (Note: The wooden sledges could not carry any more weight without being damaged.) Unfortunately the men became somewhat blase about managing the dogs and on 15 August 1912 Mawson, Ninnis and Cecil Madigan, returning from a drop at the supply depot known as Aladdin's Cave noticed that the dogs which had accompanied them had not followed them when they had left for the base. The weather was already closing in and it was decided that they could not go back to fetch the dogs. The blizzard lasted for days and it was not until 21 August that a rescue party consisting of Bob Bage, Mertz and Frank Hurley could set out. By the time the rescuers reached Aladdin's Cave, the dogs – frozen and starving – were close to death. Grandmother was in the worse condition and despite the men's best efforts died four hours later. Franklin and Basilisk were left behind again on 26 September. Mertz, Hurley and Ninnis set out rescue them on 1 October when the blizzard lifted but were forced to turn back and were not able to set out again until 3 October. They eventually located the cave but the dogs were no longer there; when the group returned to the huts they found the two dogs had arrived just ahead of them, none the worse for wear.

Early in September, Scott disappeared (Mawson believed he had probably fallen into a crevasse). This left 16 dogs to support the three sledging parties planned for the beginning of November, but Blizzard, one of the pups that had been born to Gadget early in the year, had survived and was also now big enough to pull. As Frank Bickerton's party was to test the "air-tractor sledge", it did not require dogs; Mawson decided that his party would take the 17 dogs and Madigan's team, which would be on easier ground closer to the coast, would man-haul.

The timing for the start of the sledging journey was unfortunate: all the bitches were on the point of giving birth. On 17 November, just after the three sledging parties separated, Gadget was killed because she had proved a poor puller and was judged to be tired out from carrying her pups. She was "cut up into about 24 rations counting 7 pups" to be fed to the other dogs, but they did not seem to enjoy eating her. Fusilier and Jappy followed soon afterwards; Jappy was fed to the other dogs along with the pups of Ginger Bitch. Betli disappeared on 27 November when the dogs were let off. Blizzard was injured by Mertz on skis on 18 December and had to be shot on 28 November.

On 14 December disaster struck Mawson's team. Ninnis, his sledge, and the six of the strongest dogs: Basilisk, Ginger Bitch, Shackleton, Castor, Franklin, and John Bull fell into a crevasse. Having lost their travelling companion, half the dogs and most of their supplies, Mawson and Mertz had no choice but to turn for home. They immediately began to supplement their meagre rations by killing and eating the remaining dogs. George was dispatched on 15 December, Johnson on 17 December, Mary on 18 December and Haldane on 21 December. The men had to lighten the load for the remaining dogs by discarding equipment; among the items they left was the rifle, so when they came to kill Pavlova on 23 December they had to do it with a knife. The final dog, Ginger, was killed on 28 December. Mertz died early on 8 January 1913 – it is generally thought that he suffered from vitamin A poisoning brought on by eating the dogs' livers.

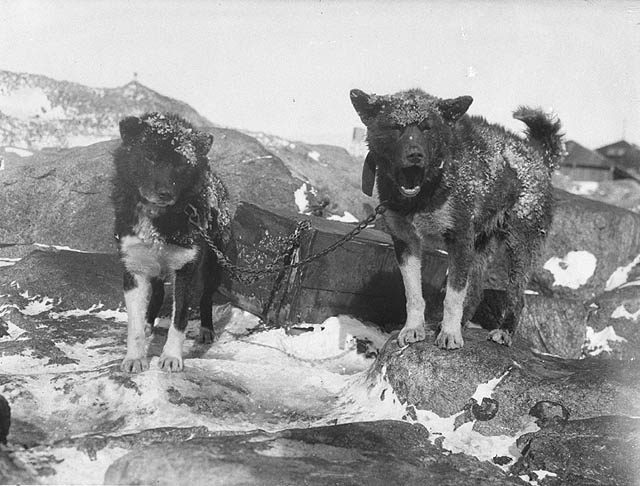
Basilisk and Ginger at Cape Denison

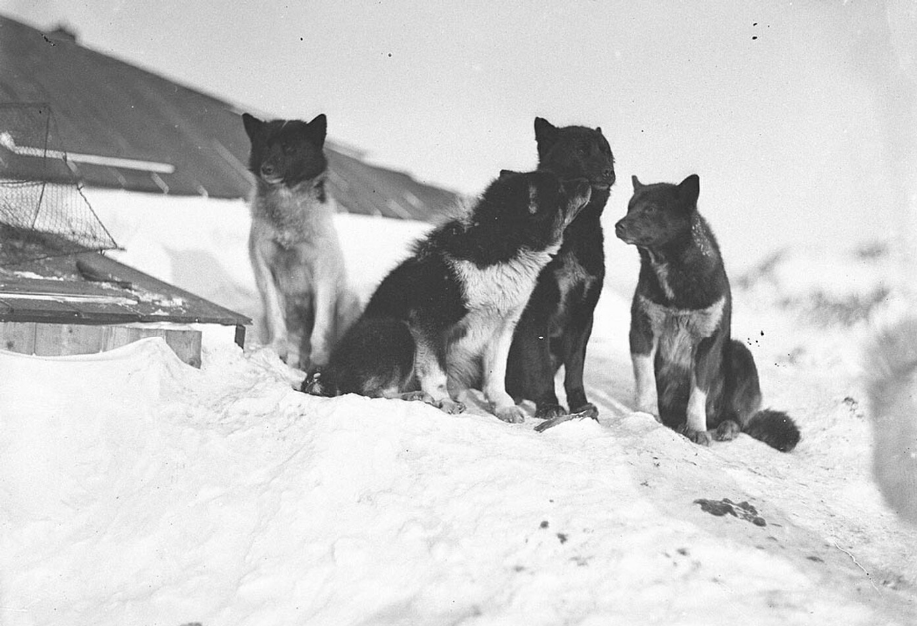
Some of the first season dogs at Cape Denison

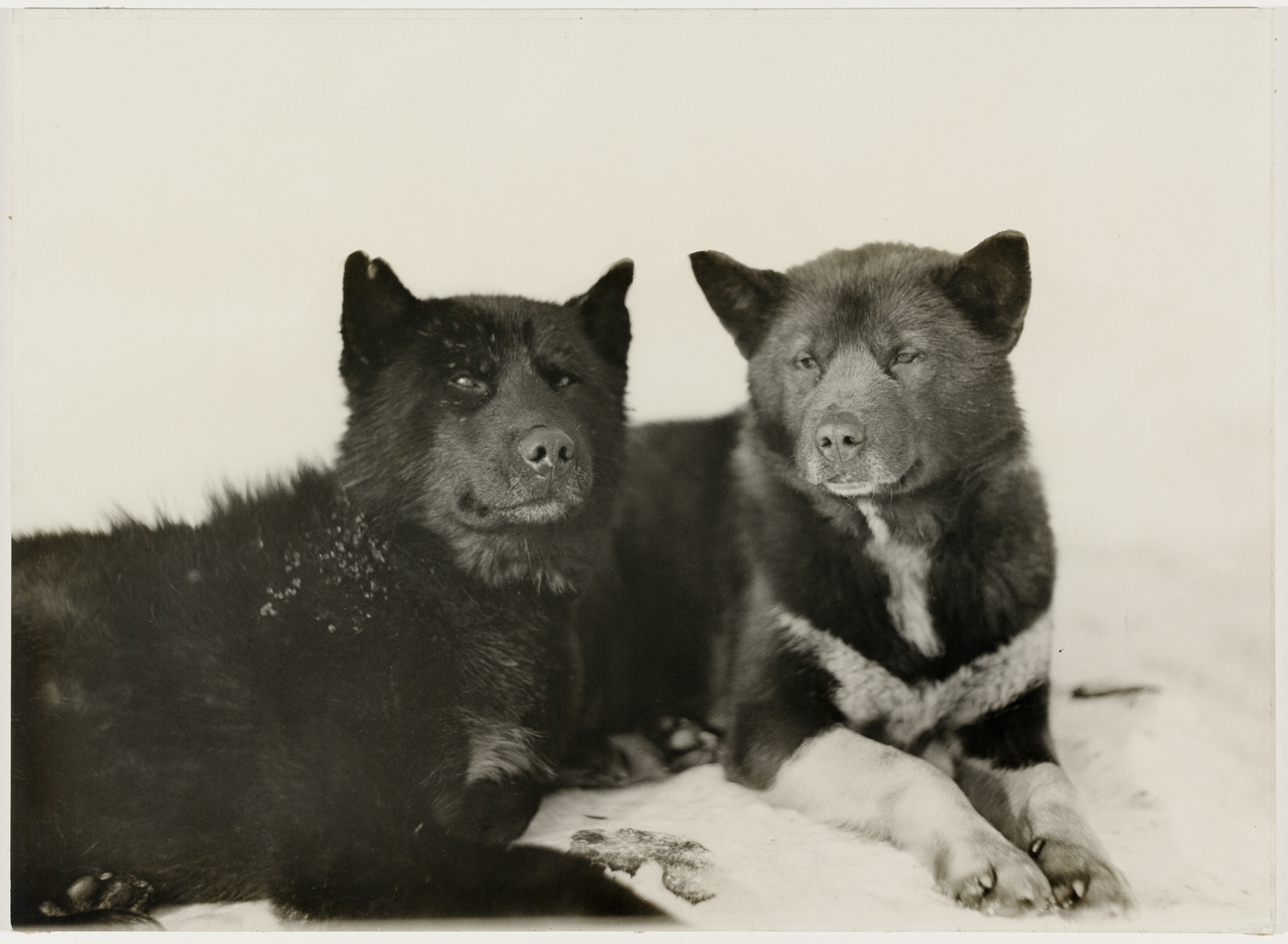
Basilisk and Ginger Bitch at Cape Denison

=== Second season, 1913 ===
Mawson made it back to base on 8 February 1913. All of the original dogs that had landed at Cape Denison were now dead; three of Ginger's pups survived – D'Urville, Ross, and Wilkes. Just before he left his Antarctic base, Amundsen had been informed that Mawson may need resupplying with dogs for a second season, so he had taken all his surviving animals on board – he had been planning on leaving a good number behind. When Aurora steamed out of Commonwealth Bay on 8 February 1913 she left behind 21 dogs that Amundsen had presented to the AAE when he put in at Hobart. Eleven of these were almost immediately shot as there were estimated to be provisions only for about 13 dogs.

The next season was mostly uneventful for the dogs. Madigan took over the duties of dog-handler. Unlike the previous year, no clear leader emerged among the dogs; instead there were small factions: the three surviving pups of Ginger: D'Urville, Ross and Wilkes formed a group; George and Lassesen joined Peary and Fix; and Colonel was the leader of the other dogs against these two groups. There was a good deal of fighting; Lassesen had to be shot after being set upon, and George was attacked a few days later. George had been set upon by Ginger's pups, and Mawson suspected they were to blame for Lassesen's death too.

After Lassesen's death, Fix, Peary and George would often separate themselves from the rest of the dogs, taking shelter amongst the rocks by the Magnetograph House. In August, Peary was attacked by all the other dogs and badly wounded; the state of his paw was of particular concern.

Mary, one of the dogs given by Amundsen, gave birth on 8 April 1913. One of her pups, Hoyle, survived to depart with the expedition, but Mary herself fell ill and had to have an operation on 30 August. It seems she did not improve and she died during a second operation on 29 October. Hoyle was treated with benevolence by the other dogs while he was a pup. Once he was put in with the other dogs on 17 July, he quickly joined the group with Ginger's pups.

The only major sledging activity of the second season was a trip to try to recover some abandoned equipment from the previous year's journeys. The dog team included Colonel, George, Wilkes and D'Urville.

Aurora returned on 13 December 1913 to collect the remaining members and on 23 December the remaining twelve dogs were brought on board ready for the ship's departure the next day.

=== Dogs at the main base ===
Name	Reason for name	Sex (Note: When the sex is not mentioned in expedition accounts the tables follow Riffenburgh (2014).)	Fate	Notes	Location named for
Amundsen	In honour of the conqueror of the South Pole who had donated 21 dogs to Mawson.	Male	Departed with expedition	One of the 21 sent by Amundsen; thought to be Pus. (Note: The suggested identities of the renamed Amundsen dogs are those of Tahan who compared the descriptions of the dogs with those of the dogs most likely donated by Amundsen.) Wild's party also had an Amundsen. Adopted by Madigan once released from quarantine.	
Basilisk	After the king of the serpents who could kill with a glance	Male	Fell into a crevasse with Ninnis 14 December 1912	Called the "head dog" by Mawson, and "the king" by Charles Laseron who said he was not the biggest of the dogs but very quick in a fight. With Pavlova he was one of the first dog to be named. With the assistance of Madigan, Mertz composed a song about Basilisk.	Basilisk Island
Betli	Unknown but perhaps named by Mertz after a bid in the card game Ulti	Female	Disappeared 27 November 1912	Had a stillborn pup 5 May 1912 which she ate	Betli Island
Blizzard	Named by Madigan after the prevailing weather conditions at Cape Denison	Female	Killed 28 November 1912	Offspring of Gadget; born 6 March 1912. Only puppy to survive from the first Adélie Land litters. On 8 July 1912 Madigan records her habit of following him up to the meteorological screen, writing "To see her caper round in a 90-mile wind and falling and slipping about on the ice is very funny. She is exhausted when she reaches the top of the hill and goes to sleep on my knees after I have fixed up the instruments". Had a fit 21 July 1912. As a pup Blizzard was housed first in the verandah and then in the hangar and was, Mawson said, "a great favourite and much in demand as a pet".	Blizzard Island
Caruso	He "never ceased howling day or night" and so drew comparisons with the operatic tenor Enrico Caruso	Male	Shot 30 March 1912		Caruso Rock
Castor	One of the twin Roman deities thought to protect seafarers. Another dog named Pollux died while Aurora was off the Mertz Glacier.	Male	Fell into a crevasse with Ninnis 14 December 1912		Castor Rock
Colonel	After Amundsen's dog.	Male	Departed with expedition	8 December 1913 is reported to have piles or frostbite. One of the dogs presented by Amundsen; thought to be Vulcanus.	
D'Urville	After the French explorer	Male	Departed with expedition	Was adopted by Mawson once released from quarantine. Son of Ginger.	
Fix	Name unchanged from that given by Amundsen's party	Male	Departed with expedition	One of the dogs presented by Amundsen. Possibly presented as a gift to Adelaide Zoo once released from quarantine.	
Fram	After Fridtjof Nansen's ship which Amundsen had used on his expedition	Male	Departed with expedition	One of the dogs presented by Amundsen; thought to be Mons. Noted as the most nervous and unfriendly of the second season's dogs.	
Franklin	Sir John Franklin, the British explorer.	Male	Fell into a crevasse with Ninnis 14 December 1912		Franklin Reef
Fusilier	Ninnis's regiment was the Royal Fusiliers	Male	Killed sometime between 17 and 27 November		Fusilier Rocks
Gadget	A newly coined term which was frequently used by the expedition (she was originally Peggy) (Note: She was not named Peggy until after the original Peggy had died on the voyage from Cape Town.)	Female	Killed 17 November 1912	Mother of Blizzard. "It was decided that Gadget, a rather miserable animal, who had shown herself useless as a puller thus far, should be killed." Had two pups 6 March 1912 (one died immediately, the other, Blizzard, survived until shot on the Far Eastern Party sledging journey)	Gadget Island
George	After George V	Male	Killed for food 15 December 1912		George Rock
George (II)	After George V	Male	Departed with expedition	One of the dogs presented by Amundsen; thought to be Gråen. 2 May 1913 Mawson writes: "The 3 pups set on George...Now pretty certain Ginger's pups did for Laseron" 29 November 1913 "George [dog] breaks away, joins others"	
Ginger	Her colouring	Female	Killed for food 28 December 1912		Ginger Reef
Ginger Bitch (Alexandra)	Officially named Alexandra after the Queen Mother, Queen Alexandra	Female	Fell into a crevasse with Ninnis 14 December 1912	Accidentally killed one of her own pups 20 May 1912. Had a pup 20 November 1912 Had 14th pup 21 November 1912	Alexandra Island
Grandmother	"Grandmother would have been better known as Grandfather. He was said to have a grandmotherly appearance; that is why he received the former name."	Male	Died 25 August 1912 after being lost for ten days	Grandmother's preserved remains were discovered in 1997 and moved inside Mawson's hut in 2016.	Grandmother Rock
Haldane	Named by Ninnis after the British Secretary of State for War, Richard Burdon Haldane	Male	Killed for food 21 December 1912		Haldane Island
Hoyle	Hoyle was a nickname given to Hurley	Male	Departed with expedition	Born 29 March or 8 April 1913. On 17 July 1913 Mawson writes: "Hoyle is now a big pup and is put in with the others." Adopted by Madigan once released from quarantine.	
Jack	A dull name to match his demeanour.	Male	Departed with expedition	One of the dogs presented by Amundsen; thought to be Gorki.	
Jappy	From Jap, which in turn came from J. A. Prestwich Industries, an aeronautical engineering firm. Ninnis had an interest in flying.	Female	Killed 20 November 1912	Fed to other dogs with Ginger Bitch's pups	
John Bull	Reportedly snapped and snarled at everybody just like the periodical.	Male	Fell into a crevasse with Ninnis 14 December 1912		John Bull Island
(Jack) Johnson	As with the heavyweight boxing champion of the same name, he was always ready for a fight.	Male	Killed for food 17 December 1912	According to Laseron "a mongrel with a big heart...covered in scars"	Jack Johnson Island
Lassesen (Lassie)	Renamed after Amundsen's favourite dog	Male	Shot 23 April 1913 after being "ripped up" by other dogs	One of the dogs presented by Amundsen; thought to be Lillegut.	Lassesen Island
Mary	Queen Mary	Female	Killed for food 18 December 1912	Had a bad foot 5 May 1912	Mary Island
Mary (II)	Queen Mary	Female	Died during surgery, 30 October 1913	One of the dogs presented by Amundsen; thought to be Katinka. Mother of Hoyle. Called "Hester" in newspaper reports of one of Mawson's radio messages.	
Mikkel	Ejnar Mikkelsen, Danish explorer	Male	Departed with expedition	One of the dogs presented by Amundsen; thought to be Brun. Noted as a good fighter by Mawson.	
Pavlova	Named by Ninnis in honour of Anna Pavlova whom he had met in London.	Female	Killed for food 23 December 1912	Had a reputation for eating her pups. Has seven pups 11 March 1912 one dies that day, all but one dead by 13 March Has pups 15 November 1912	Pavlova Island
Peary	Robert E. Peary, American explorer	Male	Departed with expedition	One of the dogs presented by Amundsen. Was set on by the other dogs and injured 5 August 1913. Possibly presented as a gift to Adelaide Zoo once released from quarantine.	
Ross	Sir James Clark Ross, pioneering Antarctic explorer	Male	Departed with expedition	Offspring of Ginger	
Scott	Robert Falcon Scott	Male	Disappeared 1 September 1912		
Shackleton	Sir Ernest Shackleton	Male	Fell into a crevasse with Ninnis 14 December 1912	Second in the ranks after Basilisk according to Mawson.	
Wilkes (Monkey)	Charles Wilkes, American explorer	Male	Departed with expedition	Offspring of Ginger. Had a role in an entertainment performed by the men one evening as "Dr. Stakanhoiser's Dog".	
Ten dogs of the twenty-one sent by Amundsen (Note: Tahan believes these ten dogs were most likely: Skøiern, Kaisagutten, Dæljen, Liket, Fin, and five of the following: Scalpen, Grim, Pasato, Lolla, Hviten, Ester, Lyn, Aja, Bella, and Olava.)			Shot 16 February 1913	Decision taken to try to ensure survival of remaining dogs through the winter	
Estimated 70+ puppies born during the expedition			Died or killed	Many did not survive because of the harsh conditions, were eaten by their mothers, or were killed and fed to the other dogs	

== Western base ==
At the western base, Andrew Watson took charge of the nine dogs, though he was assisted by Alexander Kennedy. The first problem on landing the dogs was getting them up the ice cliff to the shelf where the base was to be established. This was accomplished by attaching them to the flying fox and then sending them up a rough ladder until they were high enough for a man at the top to grab. Charles Harrisson was not impressed with the dogs:

Chained up all the dogs last night, but someone let them loose today. They ranged over the floe, foraging and fighting together worried half a dozen Adelie penguins – tore pieces out of a living seal and ate them – the infernal wretches have (in my opinion and that of some of the others) been the curse of the whole trip – and likely still to be more nuisance than assistance.

— Charles Harrisson, Diary entry for 17 February 1912

The dogs were in poor condition after their long voyage, so Wild planned for initial depot-laying sledging expedition to be man-hauled while the dogs built up their strength. Two men, Watson and Kennedy, stayed at the camp to feed and train the dogs and to fetch the remaining stores from the edge of the ice shelf. Wild and the other five men left the base on 13 March and returned on 6 April by which time Watson and Kennedy had trained five of the dogs to pull in harness, although Crippen had died on 28 March after being unwell for a few days. (Note: The five dogs were probably Amundsen, Nansen, Sandow, Switzerland and Zip. Crippen had died soon after the sledging party had left and Wild later noted that Sweep and the two bitches, Tich and Tiger, would not pull in harness.)

The two bitches, Tich and Tyger were small and did not pull well, so to preserve the party's small stock of dog food they were both shot in April. Sweep was also a poor sledge dog and it was planned that he would be killed too. On 1 May, Watson, Harrisson and Charles Hoadley took the four trained dogs on a short trip south to try them out. The sledge was lightly loaded and the dogs pulled it easily.

On 20 May, Sweep and Zip disappeared during a blizzard. Zip was found by Charles Dovers and Hoadley on the floe the next day but, although his tracks were visible all over the floe, Sweep was never seen again. Zip disappeared again on 18 July, this time with Sandow, the lead dog. After two days, Zip reappeared at the camp, but there was no trace of Sandow. Wild thought it was likely he had been crushed by large block of frozen snow falling from the glacier edge.

A further six-man depot-laying trip was planned for 20 August. There were now only three of the original nine dogs left alive: Zip, Switzerland, and the new lead dog, Amundsen. This meant that while one sledge could be pulled by the dogs, the other had to be man-hauled. A final depot-laying journey to the south – led by Jones – was scheduled for four weeks starting on 26 September with the dogs again employed to pull one of the sledges. Switzerland went missing in a blizzard during the trip and was presumed dead, but turned up after three days. When Jones's party did not return within the four weeks, Wild, Watson and Kennedy set out to look for them with additional rations, though Wild thought that they would eat the dogs if food ran low. Jones and his party were seen on the horizon when Wild's party was less than a day out.

The dates for the main exploratory journeys were set as 28 October for Wild, Watson and Kennedy to travel eastwards, and 2 November for Jones, Dovers and Hoadley to go westwards. Wild's party would take the dogs. Harrisson eventually persuaded Wild to allow him to accompany the eastern party as far as the "Hippo" depot to look after the dogs and carry additional supplies. When the party reached the depot, the sledge that had been laid up was gone; with too much weight to carry on a single sledge even with the assistance of the dogs, Wild had no other choice but to include Harrisson and his sledge on the rest of the journey. The dogs were pulling well but were hungry:

The dogs were working very well and, if only a little additional food could be procured for them, I knew they could be kept alive. Zip broke loose one night and ate one of my socks which was hanging on the sledge to dry; it probably tasted of seal blubber from the boots. Switzerland, too, was rather a bother, eating his harness whenever he had a chance. — Frank Wild, Home of the Blizzard

Despite including an extra man in the party the men were not short of rations but, by the time Wild was forced to turn for home on 27 November, the dog food was exhausted. They fed the dogs with their own biscuit ration for a while, but on 6 December Wild felt he could not risk using any more of the men's dwindling rations. Switzerland was shot and his meat fed to the other two dogs; Zip would not eat it, but Amundsen did not hesitate. A couple of days later, the party managed to catch almost seventy snow petrels and collect sixty of their eggs. This bounty assured the dogs survival until they reached a depot with more rations which in turn meant they had sufficient food to be able to reach the camp.

Formerly the two bigger dogs, Amundsen and Switzerland had ganged up against Zip whenever there was a fight, but with Switzerland gone, Zip began to assert himself and "downed" Amundsen several times. By 4 January both dogs had sore and bleeding paws so they were let off and the men took over the hauling of the sledge for a while; it was the first time Zip had been let off pulling the sledge for over 4 months. The following day they were harnessed up again but they were still both lame and Zip was soon limping badly, so they were let off again.

On 6 January the party reached the hut to the great joy of Morton Moyes who had thought Harrisson dead. The dogs immediately began hunting out food and Amundsen (whom Harrisson disparagingly called "Chucklehead") gorged himself:

The dogs have had a day! Chucklehead was busy in the rubbish heap when we arrived. Had had a breakfast of a couple of snow petrels – but round the hut with the scraps we took out, he manages to "fill up" – for he’s not the least particular in his diet. By 3 pm he looked like perambulating [indecipherable] with a barrel under his hide. An hour or so later he was lying helplessly by the sledges. If you spoke to him, he curled his lip in a sort of inane grin & feebly waved a forepaw – lying the while full length on the snow. It appeared to be the only movement that he was capable of! There I saw him in the early hours of the morning, still lying in the same position, gorged & incapable. Zip had a proper gorge too, but not helplessly so like Chuckles.

— Charles Harrisson, Diary entry for 6 January 1913

Aurora was due imminently, so the men concentrated on scientific work, preparing for departure and also for the possibility of having to spend another year in Antarctica if the ship could not reach them. This left the dogs mostly free. Recovering from the deprivations of the eastern journey they quickly lost form and put on weight. The men took them out on occasional short sledging trips but they were at first reluctant to be back in harness. By the time the men started moving items to the floe in preparation for leaving, the dogs were fitter and pulling well, and by 9 February Harrisson reported: "Two dogs are now good friends, & they were gamboling & playing together in the soft snow there like 2 puppies."

Aurora arrived on 25 February and by the evening the men and dogs were on board heading for Tasmania.

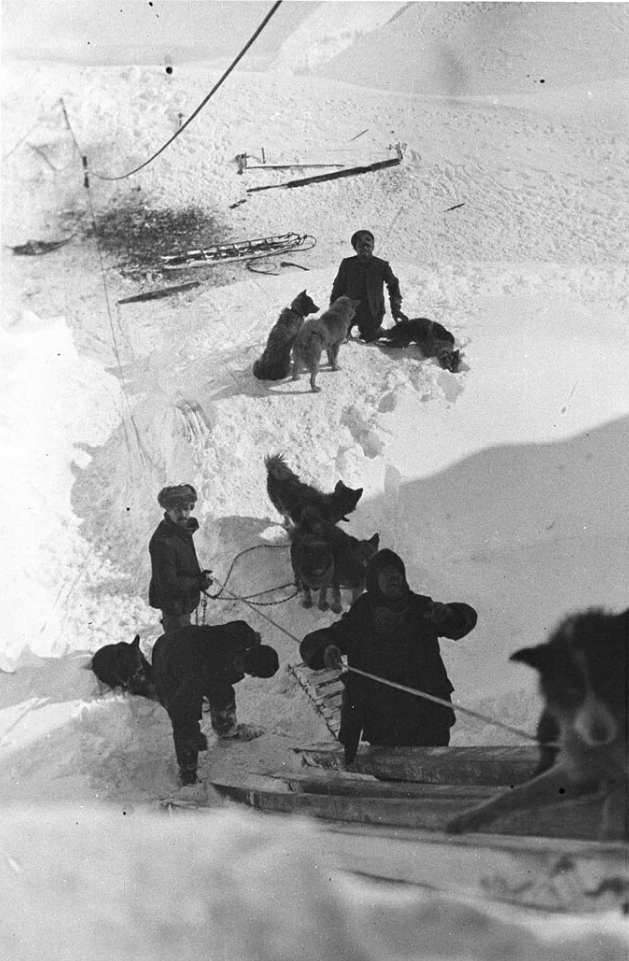
Hauling the dogs up the flying fox just after landing. Eight of the nine dogs can be seen.

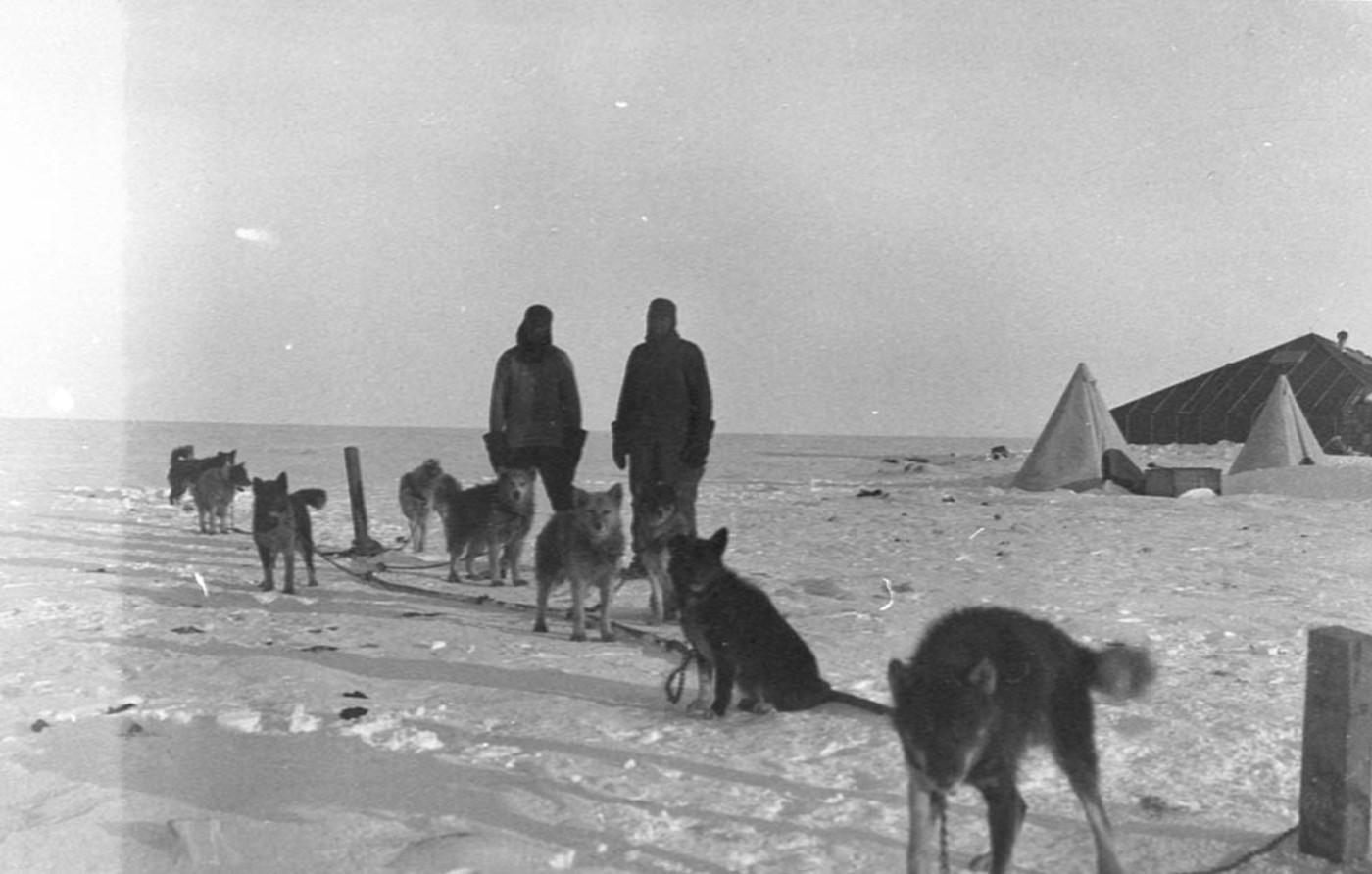
The dogs tethered out at "The Grottoes". All nine of the western base dogs are shown

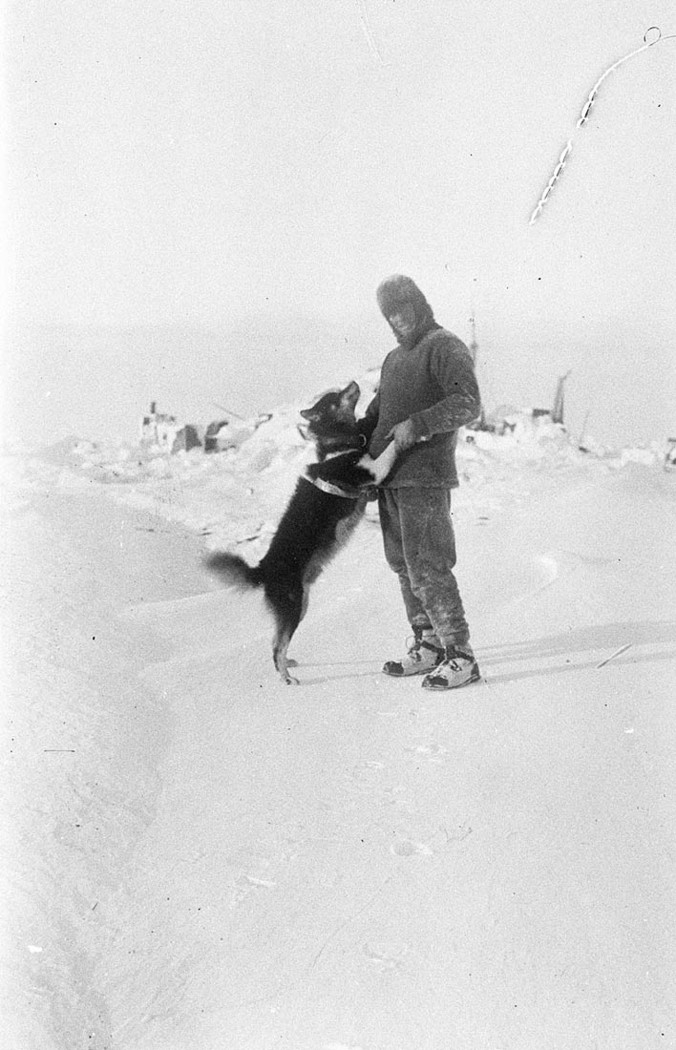
Watson and Sandow at "The Grottoes"

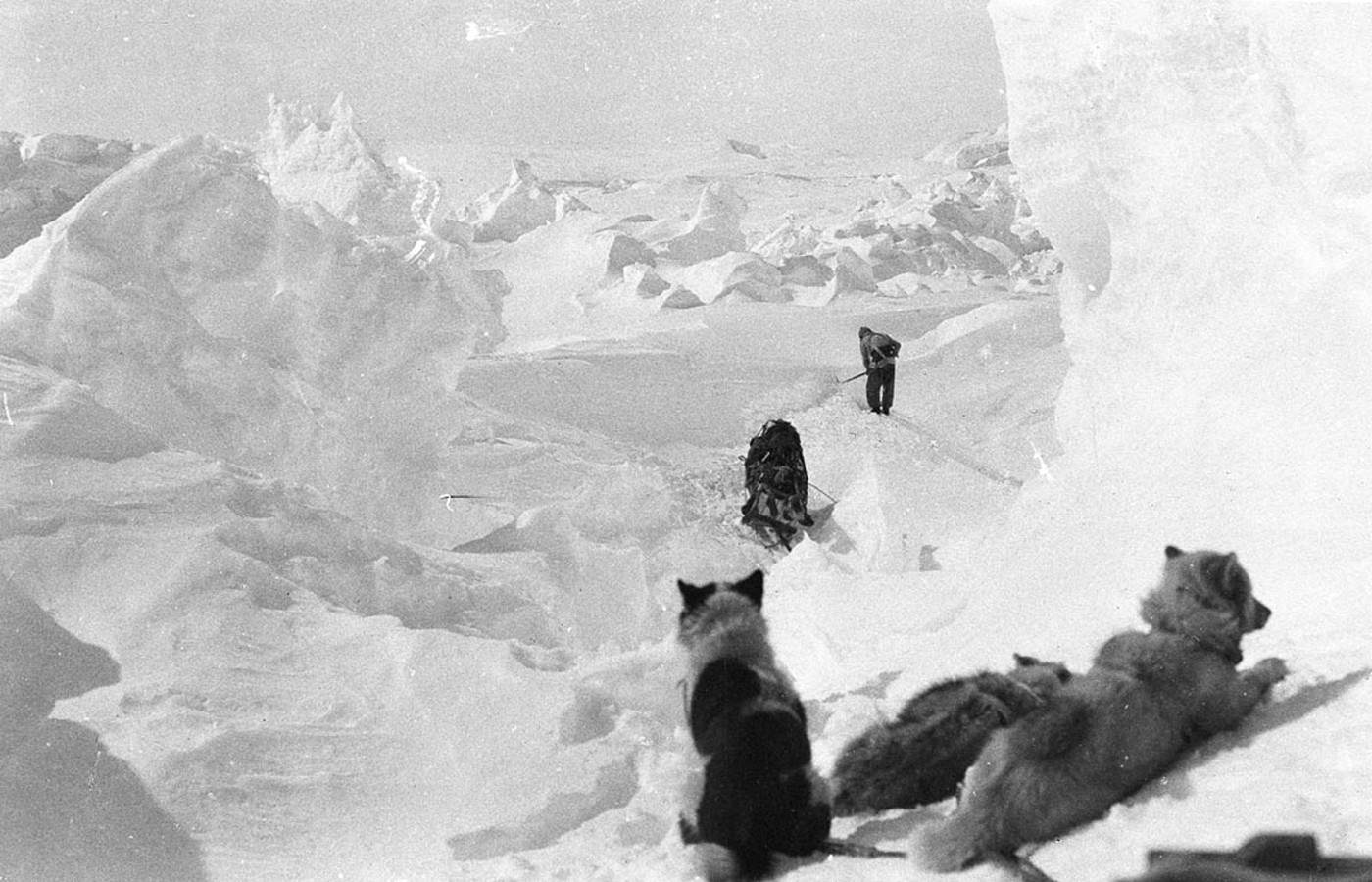
Zip, Amundsen and Switzerland at the Denman Glacier

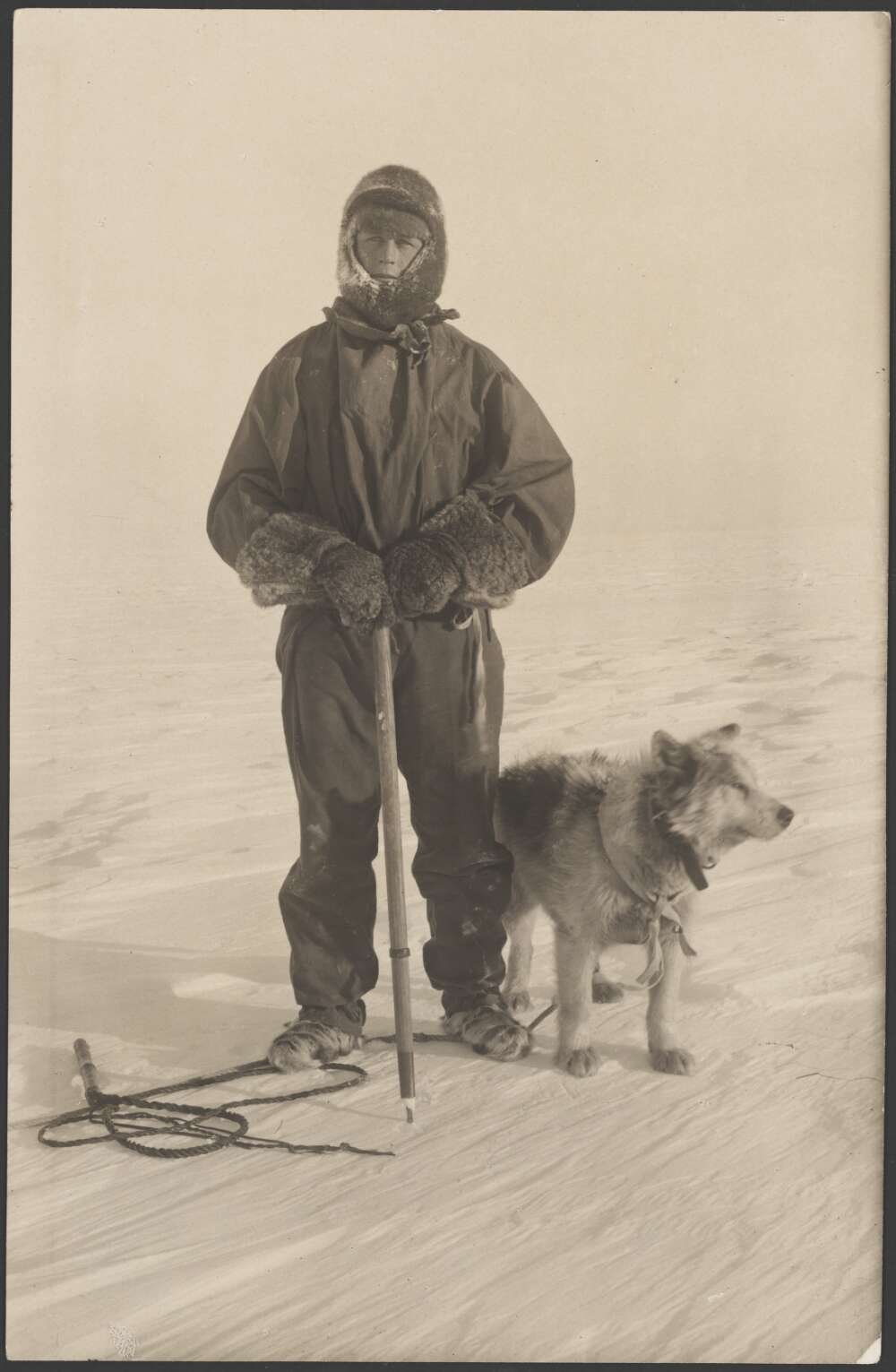
Watson and Zip, one of the surviving dogs

=== Dogs at the western base ===
Name	Reason for name	Sex	Fate	Notes	Location named for
Amundsen	As with the Amundsen at the main base, named for the explorer	Male	Returned to Tasmania with the party	Died of heatstroke and overeating while in quarantine on 8 April 1913 during a heatwave.	
Crippen	After the murderer Dr. Hawley Crippen	Male	Died 28 March 1912		Crippen Rock
Nansen	Fridtjof Nansen, the pioneering Arctic explorer	Male	Died 14 April 1912		
Sandow	Eugen Sandow, a famous bodybuilder and strongman, had made a small contribution to the expedition	Male	Disappeared 18 July 1912	Leader of the western base dogs. Wild thought it likely he had been killed in a snowfall	Sandow Island
Sweep	After the expedition's practice of running sweeps on anything and everything	Male	Disappeared 20 May 1912		Sweep Rock
Switzerland	Mertz's homeland	Male	Killed 6 December 1912	The party had run out of biscuit for the dogs so killed Switzerland and fed him to the other dogs, Amundsen and Zip. Zip refused the food.	Switzerland Island
Tich	After Little Tich, the English music-hall performer Harry Relph	Female	Shot 27 April 1912	Moyes recorded "Dogs had a great fight all falling on Switz, who turned on them pluckily. Titch shot today. Biscuit for them is getting scarce."	Tich Rocks
Tiger	Her striped markings	Female	Shot 18 April 1912	Shot by Moyes who was on dog duty. He recorded in his diary "Wish somebody else had had the job."	
Zip	The nickname of H. E. Meade, one of Ninnis's closest friends	Male	Returned to Tasmania with the party		Zip Point

== Macquarie Island ==
The Macquarie Island party was chiefly concerned with wireless work and though they had a scientific program as well – George Ainsworth was a meteorologist, Harold Hamilton was a biologist, and Leslie Blake a cartographer and geologist – they did not need sledge dogs on the sub-Antarctic island. When Aurora first landed the men to establish the base the Greenland dogs were let off, but for much of their eleven-day stay they were not allowed to roam free; they were tethered close to the sealers' hut. One dog, "The Devil", was left behind, she had been intractable from the beginning, biting her handlers and the other dogs, so she was abandoned on Macquarie Island where it was thought she "could find abundant food and worry nobody". Nothing further was recorded of her except that she became wilder and had to be shot in February 1913.

The Macquarie Island party also had a spaniel, Mac. She had apparently wandered on board Aurora while it was in port at Hobart. She was a special favourite of Blake and often accompanied him and Hamilton on surveying and hunting trips. She proved adept at hunting rabbits and wekas to supplement the men's diet and helped keep the expedition's hut clear of rats. The sealers that were on the island before, during and after the expedition also had a dog and they would frequently visit the hut with him in the evenings. At the end of May, Mac gave birth to six pups.

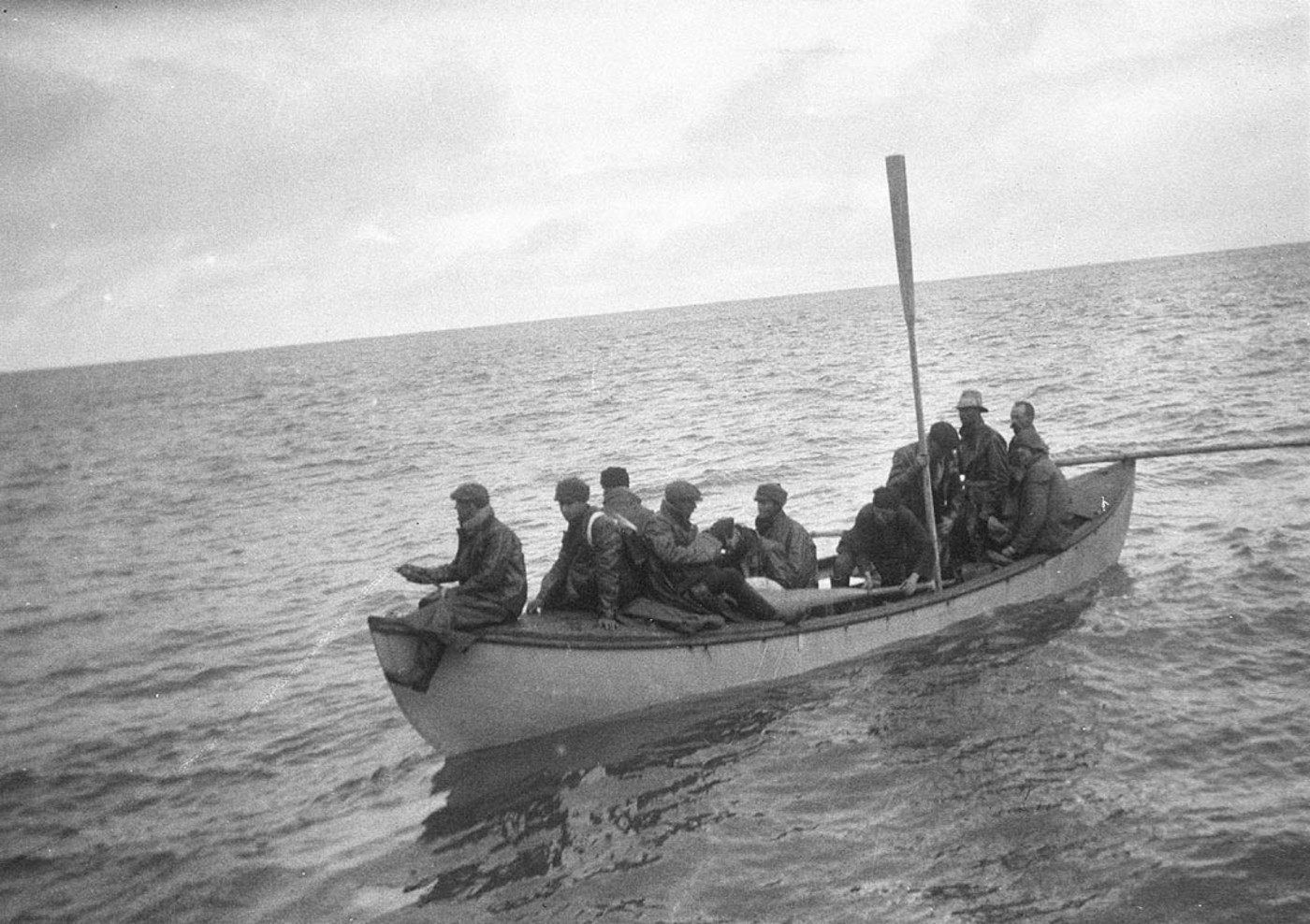
The final landing of the Macquarie Island party. Mac can be seen being held near the centre of the boat.

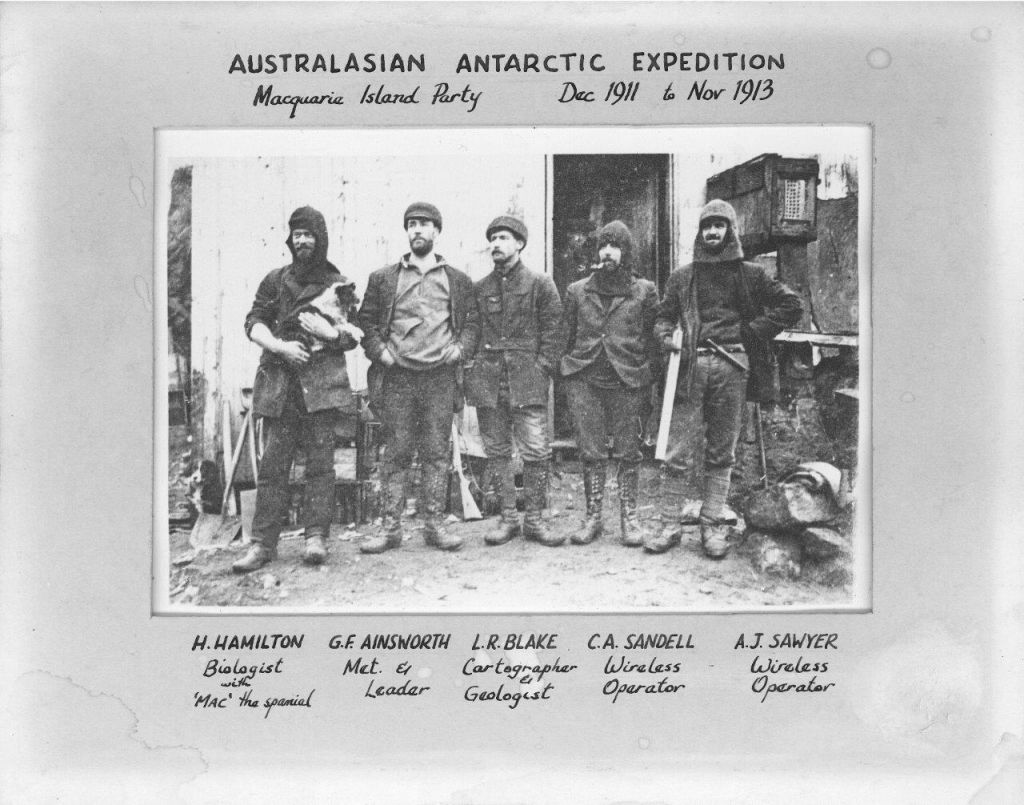
The Macquarie Island party with the spaniel, Mac. Another dog can be seen at the side of the hut.

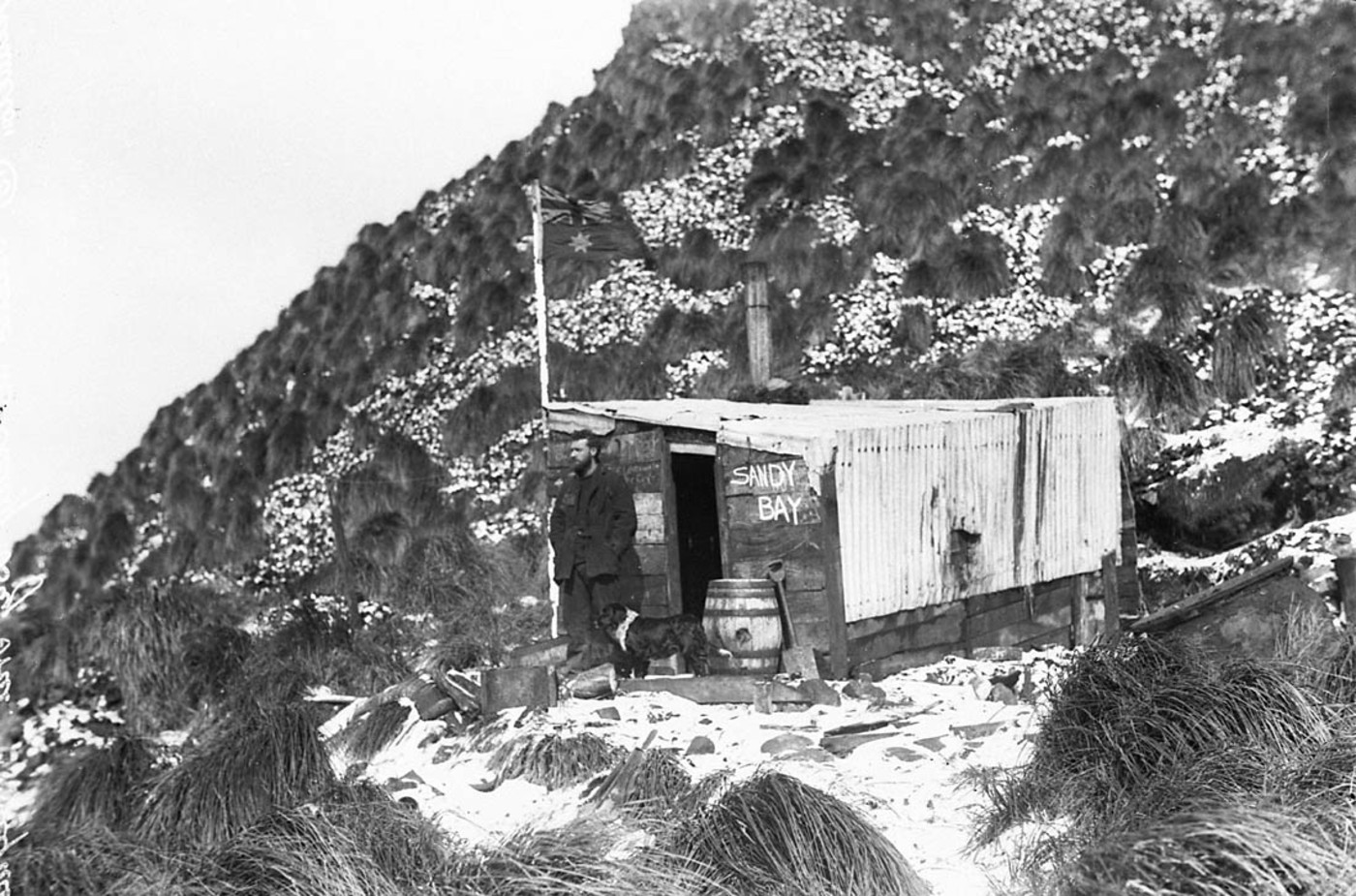
Blake with Mac at Sandy Bay Hut

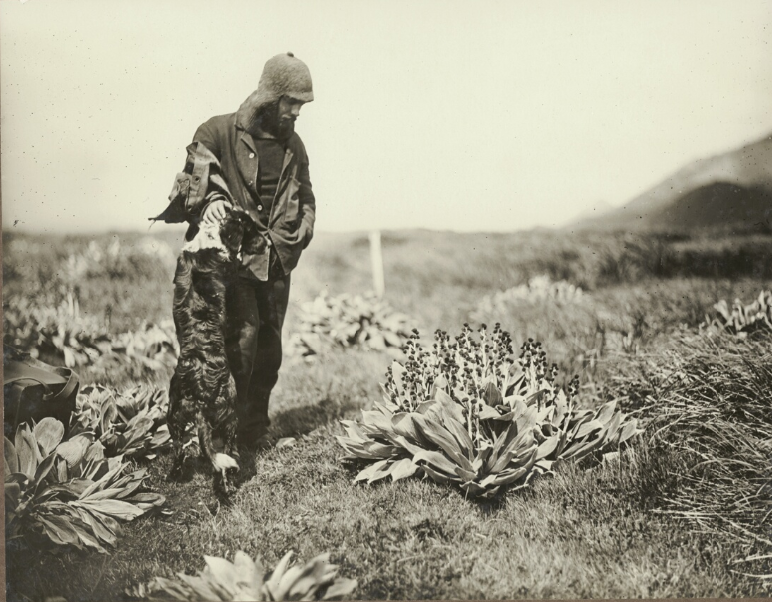
Mac on a survey

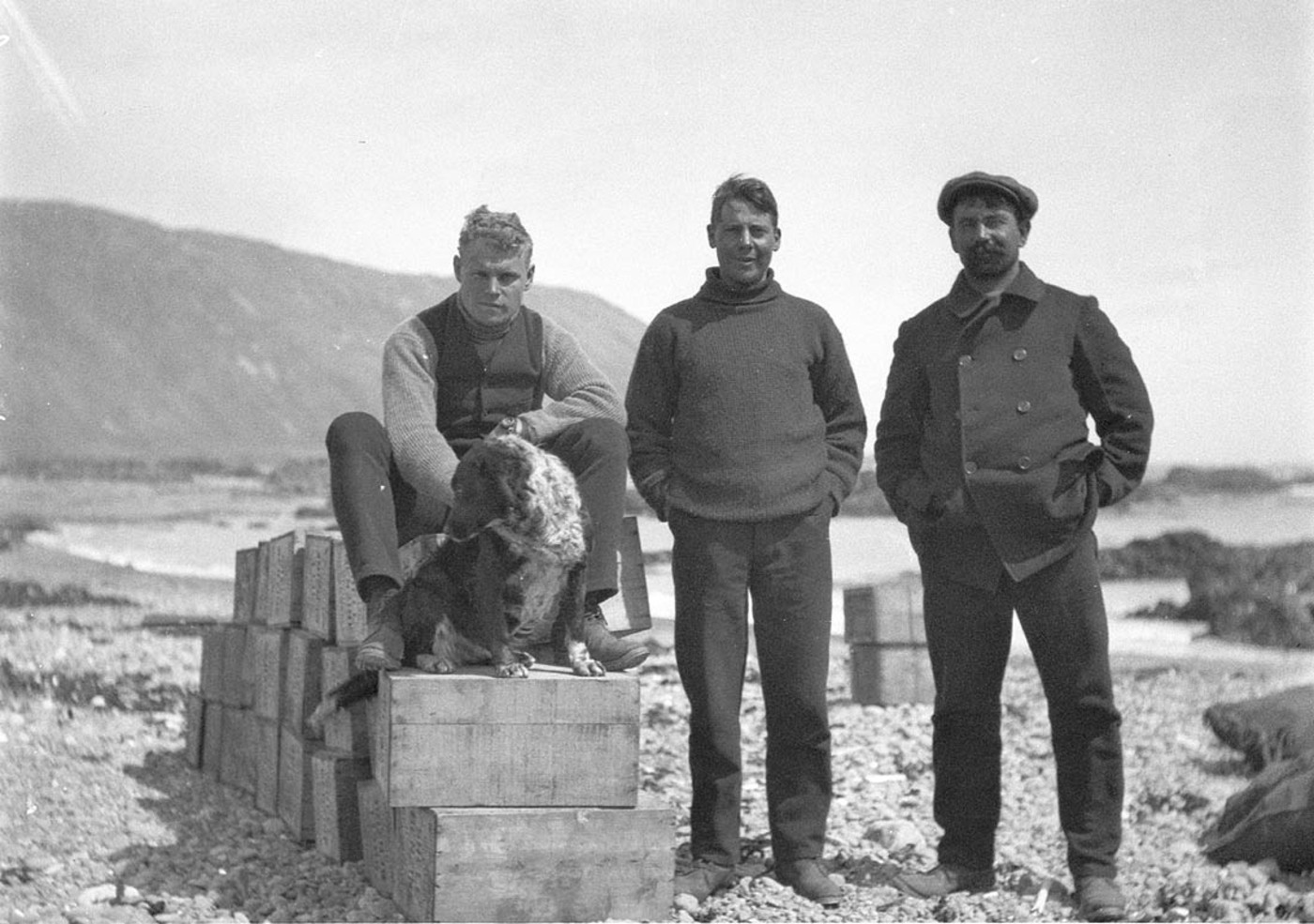
The meteorological staff that relieved Ainsworth's party in late 1913

=== Dogs on Macquarie Island ===
Name	Reason for name	Sex	Fate	Notes	Location named for
The Devil	Her 'savage intractable disposition'	Female	Shot February 1913	Described as a "savage brute" by Laseron, she was abandoned on Macquarie Island at the start of the expedition. She became wilder and fiercer and eventually had to be shot.	The Devil Rock
Mac	Short for Macquarie	Female	Unknown	The pet of the Macquarie Island party; a spaniel. She gave birth to six pups around 23 May 1913, probably sired by one of the dogs belonging to the sealers who were also camped on Macquarie Island and were frequent visitors to the party's hut.	

== After the expedition ==
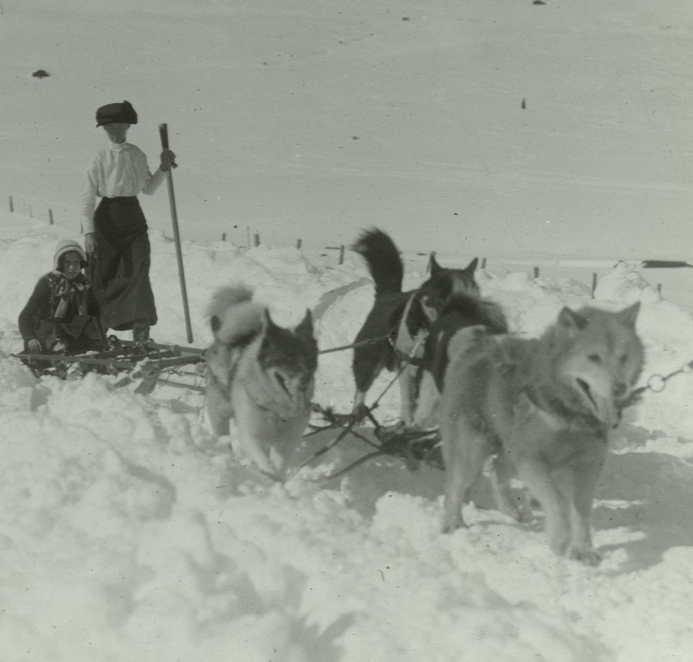
Expedition dogs pulling a sledge at Kosciuszko National Park

The two dogs of the western base that had survived, Amundsen and Zip, returned with Wild's party at the end of the first season. While on the trip home it was planned that Harrisson would take Zip and Dovers would take Amundsen:

The inconstant Andy proved faithless to his old favourite, Zip, so I'm taking him – not that I want him but we have trudged so many miles together. Dovers wants to "swap" Chucks for Zip. I declined – would not have Chucklehead at any price. Zip is knowing. He slips aft soon as it gets dark and sleeps by the Captain's door where he gets the warmth of the furnaces. Greeted me this morning with a series of "How woo woos". — Charles Harrisson, Diary entry for 10 March 1913

The dogs had to go into quarantine again on their arrival in Hobart and while they were there it was reported that they had been secured for Kosciuszko National Park where they would continue their role as sledge dogs, pulling tourists. Amundsen never made it out of quarantine: he died of heatstroke and overeating on 8 April 1913 during a heatwave. Zip was released from quarantine on 10 April and Harrisson took him home for two days before delivering him to the Westralia for transport to Sydney and then on to Mount Kosciuszko. He was later photographed there pulling a sledge with Tresor, one of the dogs from Scott's expedition, but was identified in the photo as "Peary".

The twelve dogs that embarked from Cape Denison at the end of the expedition had perhaps been reduced to eleven by the time Aurora reached Adelaide on 26 February 1914 – some reporters who had gone on board the ship when it docked mentioned only eleven dogs – but the fate of the missing animal was not recorded by anybody, (Note: The twelve dogs that left the main base were: Amundsen, Colonel, D'Urville, Fix, Fram, George, Hoyle, Jack, Mikkel, Peary, Ross and Wilkes. Amundsen, Colonel, D'Urville, Hoyle, Peary and Ross appear in later records and a dog matching Fix's description was on Aurora when it docked, so if a dog was lost it was probably Fram, George, Jack, Mikkel or Wilkes.) and when the remaining dogs were transferred to Adelaide Zoo for their quarantine most reports said there were twelve.

At the zoo they were on display; eight of them were housed in a cage between the polar bear enclosure and the dingos, three were in a separate cage nearby, and one had to be separated from the group because it had a "quarrelsome disposition" and continually started fights with the others. The dogs drew crowds eager to see the animals that had accompanied Mawson and it was noted that the dogs appeared uncomfortable in the heat; they were panting heavily and quickly losing their thick Antarctic coats; they were given ice in their cages to help keep them cool. Peary, Ross and Hoyle were mentioned by name in one newspaper report though it claimed there were two dogs named Peary in the group, one of which was the leader and only black dog.

Mawson announced that any of the members of the expedition who wished to could adopt one of the dogs once their quarantine was completed. When the dogs were released from quarantine on 3 March, Mawson took D'Urville and Madigan took two as presents: Hoyle for his wife and Amundsen for his sister. (Note: Riffenburgh gives dates for the deaths of the two dogs taken by Madigan: Hoyle: 1916 and Amundsen: 1920.) It seems that all but six of the remaining dogs were adopted by members of the expedition. On 7 March, four were donated to the Government Tourist Bureau; they were taken to Sydney and then on to Mount Kosciuszko where they joined Zip and dogs from the expeditions of Amundsen and Scott. On the same day, Mawson presented two of the dogs to Adelaide Zoo; these may have been Fix and Peary. The two dogs were still at the zoo in July 1914.

Colonel was among the four dogs destined for Mount Kosciuszko – his size and strength drew admiring comments from a visitor to the park in December 1914. At the end of July 1916 a newspaper article mentioned that there was a dog team of sixteen pulling a sledge in the park and that eight of those dogs had seen "service in the Antarctic with Sir Douglas Mawson".

There was no mention of Mac, the spaniel of the Macquarie Island party, in any of the newspaper stories about the arrival of the expedition or about the dogs in quarantine. It is possible she was left behind with the sealers on Macquarie Island or was adopted by the three-man meteorological relief party that arrived as Ainsworth and the others were leaving.

On 2 August 2017, the Australian Antarctic Division Place Names Committee announced that it would be memorialising the dogs of Mawson's expedition by naming 26 locations in the Australian Antarctic and sub-Antarctic territories after them. The dogs honoured included most members of the original groups at the main and western bases, as well as Lassesen from the Amundsen group, "The Devil" who was left behind on Macquarie Island, and Jefferies who died on board Aurora during the search for a suitable base site.

On 11 April 2018, a statue of Basilisk and Alexandra (Ginger Bitch) was unveiled outside the Mawson's Huts Replica Museum in Hobart.

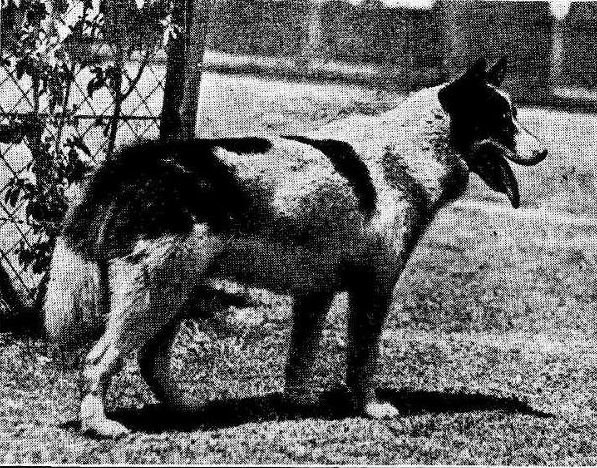
Zip pictured in quarantine, February 1913

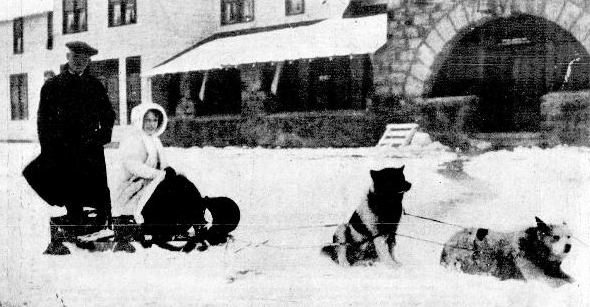
Zip and Tresor (one of the dogs from Scott's expedition) outside the hotel at Mount Kosciuszko in June 1913. Zip had been renamed Peary by this time.

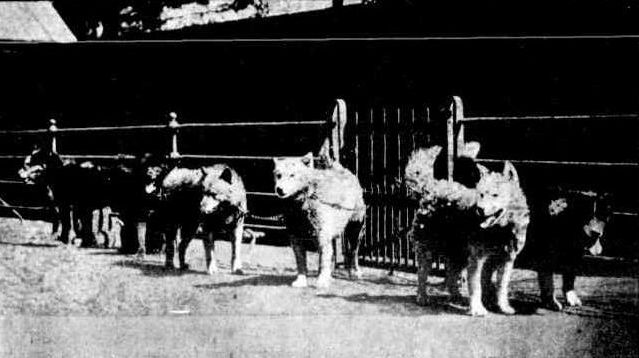
Some of the surviving dogs pictured when Aurora docked in Adelaide, February 1914

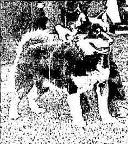
D'Urville pictured at the wedding of Mawson and Paquita Delprat, 31 March 1914
