= McLean Nunataks =

The McLean Nunataks (67°50′S 143°57′E) are a group of three nunataks lying within the western part of Mertz Glacier, Antarctica, near the head. They were discovered by the Australasian Antarctic Expedition (1911–14) under Douglas Mawson, who named them after Dr. Archibald Lang McLean, the medical officer and bacteriologist with the expedition.
