= Cape Hurley =

Ice-covered coastal point in Antarctica

Cape Hurley (67°36′S 145°18′E) is an ice-covered coastal point in Antarctica, marking on the east the mouth of the depression occupied by Mertz Glacier. It was discovered by the Australasian Antarctic Expedition (1911–14) under Douglas Mawson, who named it for Frank Hurley, the official photographer of the expedition.
