= Mount Murchison (George V Coast) =

Mountain in George V Land, Antarctica

Mount Murchison (67°19′S 144°15′E) is a dome-shaped, mostly snow-covered mountain, 565 metres (1,850 ft) high, on the west side of the Mertz Glacier, about 11 miles (18 km) southwest of the head of Buchanan Bay. It was discovered by the Australasian Antarctic Expedition (1911–14) under Douglas Mawson, who named it for Roderick Murchison of Melbourne, a patron of the expedition.
