= Aurora Peak =

Mountain in Antarctica

Highest point
- Elevation: 535 m (1,755 ft)
- Coordinates: 67°23′S 144°12′E

Geography
- Location: George V Land, East Antarctica

Aurora Peak is an Antarctic peak 535 metres (1,755 ft) high along the west side of the Mertz Glacier, 4 miles (6 km) south of Mount Murchison. It was discovered by the Australasian Antarctic Expedition (1911–14) under Douglas Mawson. The members of the eastern coastal party (A. L. McLean, P. E. Correll, and C. T. Madigan) named it after the expedition ship Aurora.
