= Fisher Bay =

Bay in Antarctica

Coordinates: 67°31′S 145°45′E

Fisher Bay is an embayment about 14 miles (23 km)wide between the eastern side of the Mertz Glacier Tongue and the mainland of Antarctica. It was discovered by the Australasian Antarctic Expedition (1911–14) under Douglas Mawson, who named it for Andrew Fisher, Prime Minister of Australia in 1911.
