= Archibald Lang McLean =

Australian bacteriologist

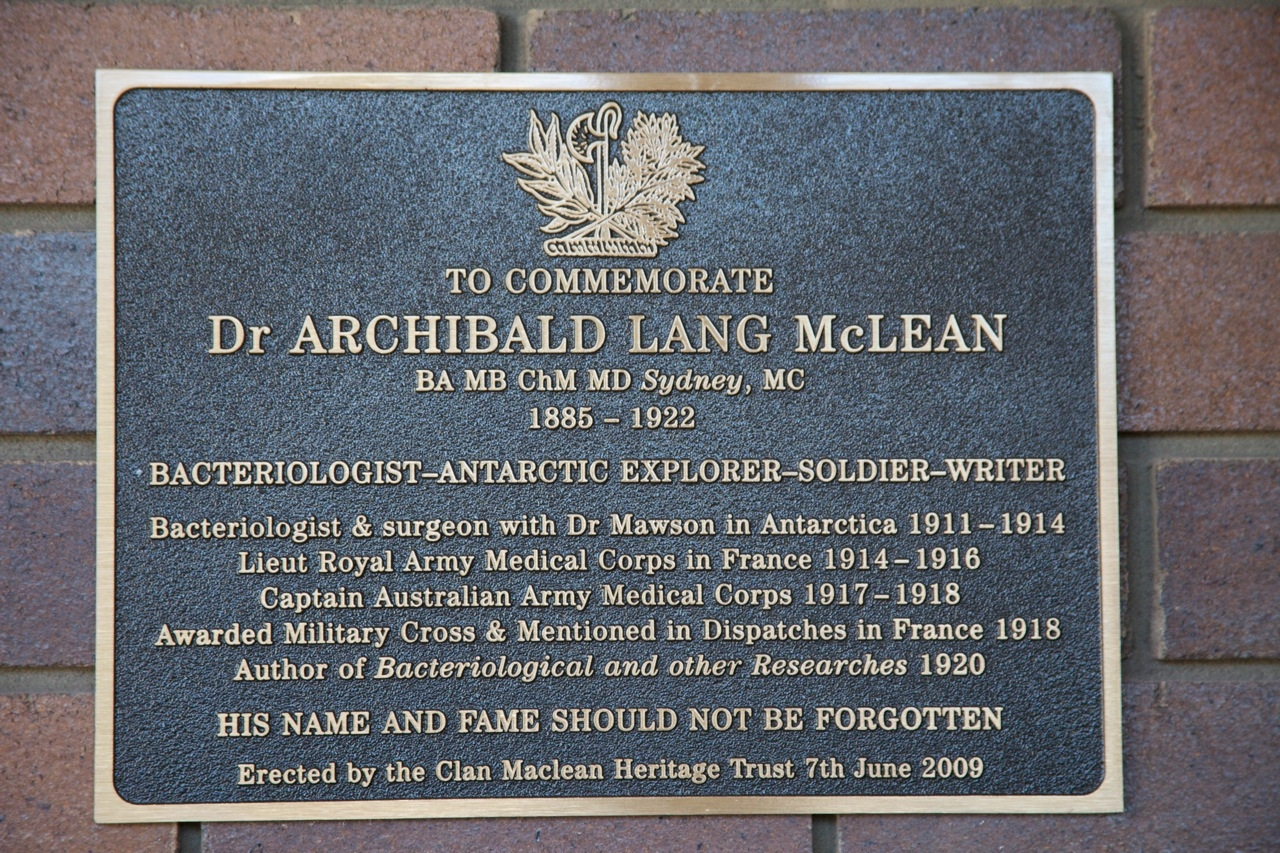
Memorial plaque at the University of Sydney, Australia, commemorating Dr Archibald Lang McLean (1885 – 1922) erected by Clan Maclean Heritage Trust in 2009.

Archibald Lang McLean (1885–13 May 1922) was an Australian bacteriologist known for his role as chief doctor on Sir Douglas Mawson's Australasian Antarctic Expedition.

== Biography ==
Archie McLean was born in Balmain, New South Wales on 27 March 1885. He was the grandson of Scottish migrants from Balmaha on the east side of Loch Lomond. He attended Five Dock Public School and later Fort Street High School before completing a Bachelor of Arts at the University of Sydney in 1906. He then studied medicine and graduated as a Master of Surgery in 1911.

He was selected to join the Australasian Antarctic Expedition in 1911 as chief medical officer. Part of his role on the expedition was to study the effects of the Antarctic environment on other members of the expedition by taking regular blood samples and skin swabs. He took part in the Easter Sledging Journey with Cecil Madigan and Percy Correll, and after their return to main base remained there awaiting the return of Mawson, Xavier Mertz and Lieutenant Belgrave Ninnis. When Mawson returned, McLean treated his injuries and later treated wireless operator Sidney Jeffryes for symptoms of paranoia. McLean Nunataks are named in his honour. He arrived back in Australia in March 1914 and then travelled with Mawson to England.

After the outbreak of World War I, he joined the Royal Army Medical Corps and served until 1916 when he was discharged for health reasons and returned to Australia. He completed his doctorate at the University of Sydney before joining the First Australian Imperial Force in the Australian Army Medical Corps in 1917 and returning to Europe. He was awarded the Military Cross for his service. He was discharged due to a bout of tuberculosis.

He returned to Australia, where he was appointed Medical Officer at the Red Cross War Chest Farm Colony in Beelbangara, New South Wales, however his condition worsened and he died in 1922.
