= Mertz Glacier =

Glacier of Antarctica

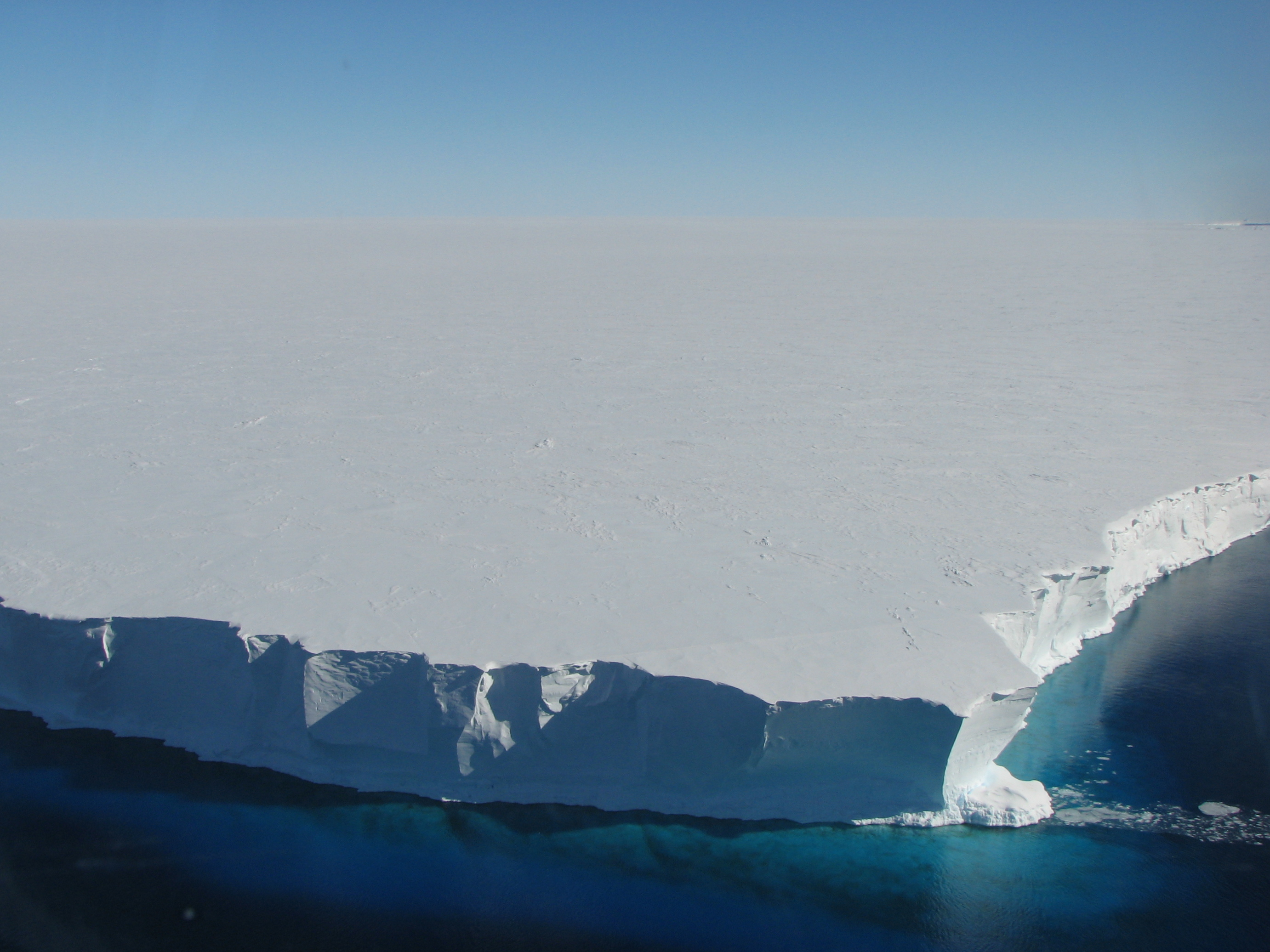
Mertz Glacier

Mertz Glacier (67°30′S 144°45′E) is a heavily crevassed glacier in George V Coast of East Antarctica. It is the source of a glacial prominence that historically has extended northward into the Southern Ocean, the Mertz Glacial Tongue. It is named in honor of the Swiss polar explorer Xavier Mertz.

The Mertz-Ninnis Valley (67°25′S 146°0′E) is an undersea valley named in association with the Mertz Glacier and the Ninnis Glacier.

== Geography ==
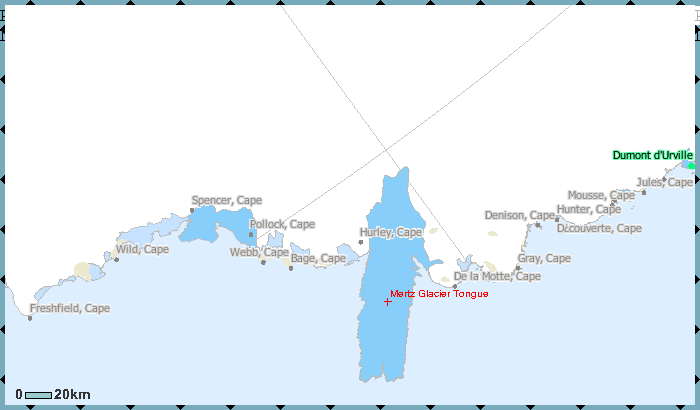
The protruding part of the glacier tongue broke away in February 2010

Mertz Glacier is about 45 miles (72 km) long and averaging 20 miles (32 km) wide. It reaches the sea at the head of a 60 km fjord where it continues as a large glacier tongue out between Cape De la Motte/Buchanan Bay on the West, and Cape Hurley/Fisher Bay on the east, into the Southern Ocean. The Mertz Glacier Tongue (67°10′S 145°30′E) is about 50 miles (80 km) long in total hence it protrudes about 20–25 km out into the Ocean. It is roughly 25 miles (40 km) wide. The Glacier delivers about 10 to 12 Gigatons of ice per year to the fjord and the Tongue advances at about 1 km per year down the fjord and out into the Ocean.

== History ==
The glacier was discovered by the Australasian Antarctic Expedition (1911–14) under Douglas Mawson, who named it for Xavier Mertz, a member of the expedition who died on January 7, 1913, on the far-east sledge journey. Mertz's body likely remains in the glacier that bears his name, a few miles closer to the Southern Ocean than when he was buried in the ice by Mawson.

=== 2010 calving ===
These images show the iceberg and glacier tongue immediately before and after the collision.

In February 2010 about half of the Mertz Glacier Tongue, a piece of ice about 78 kilometres (48 mi) long and 33–39 kilometres (21–24 mi) wide and protruding 100 kilometres (62 mi) out into the Southern Ocean, broke away from the main body of the Tongue. The separation occurred around the 12 or 13 February along two existing rift lines on opposite sides of the Tongue. The event was helped in part when the large Iceberg B-9B collided with it. Iceberg B-9B is a 97 kilometres (60 mi) long by 30 kilometres (19 mi) wide remnant of Iceberg B-9 which broke off the Ross Ice Shelf in 1987 and has recently ungrounded itself from Ninnis Bank to the east of the Tongue where it had been lodged for 18 years.

The newly formed iceberg has been named Iceberg C-28, because it is the 28th substantial iceberg to have broken off the Antarctic ice shelf, in the quadrant that faces Australia, since 1976. The iceberg is 400 metres (1,300 ft) high, has a surface area of 2,545 square kilometres (983 sq mi) and weights in at about 860 billion tonnes. According to Australian glaciologist Neal Young, such an event occurs once in 50 to 100 years. As the Tongue advances at 1 km per year this new iceberg represents about 70 years of glacier advance. Within 2 weeks the Mertz Iceberg rotated about the point of impact with B9-B and lay parallel with the coastline. The iceberg drifted westwards after the collision and in April 2010 hit a submerged peak which caused it to break into two pieces.

The flow of icebergs from the calved glacier tongue has reduced the effectiveness of the polynya west of Mertz Glacier that acted as one of Antarctica's major areas for the formation of dense Antarctic Bottom Water. The calving could affect future thermohaline circulation around Antarctica.

== Important Bird Area ==
A 641 ha site on fast ice near the northern, or terminal, edge of the glacier toe has been designated an Important Bird Area (IBA) by BirdLife International because it supports a colony of emperor penguins. Since its original identification in 2009, and the split of the tongue in 2010, the colony split into two sub-colonies about 20 km apart, with a ground census estimating some 5,100 breeding pairs in the western colony and 2,300 breeding pairs in the eastern.

== See also ==
- Ice stream
- List of glaciers in the Antarctic
- List of Antarctic ice streams
- Petermann Glacier
- Wilkins Sound
