= November 1912 =

Month of 1912

<<	November 1912					>>
Su	Mo	Tu	We	Th	Fr	Sa
					1	2
3	4	5	6	7	8	9
10	11	12	13	14	15	16
17	18	19	20	21	22	23
24	25	26	27	28	29	30

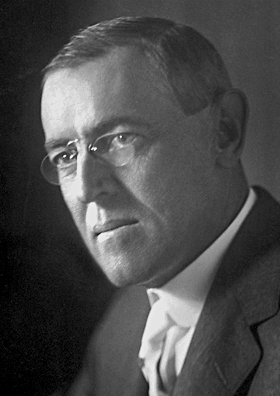
November 5, 1912: New Jersey Governor Woodrow Wilson wins U.S. presidential election

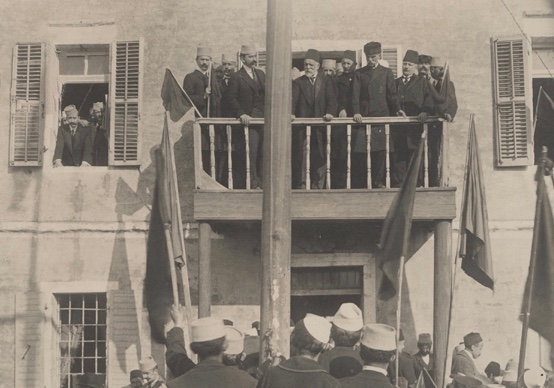
November 28, 1912: Albania declares independence from Ottoman Empire

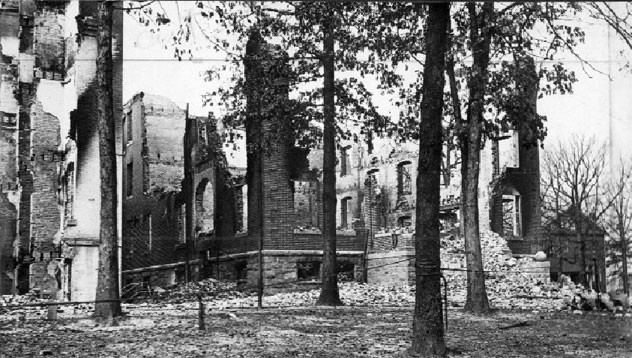
November 29, 1912: University of Maryland destroyed by fire

The 1912 double-headed eagle flag of Albania

The following events occurred in November 1912:

== November 1, 1912 (Friday) ==
- General Mario García Menocal, the nominee of Cuba's Conservative Party, was elected President of Cuba, defeating Vice-president Alfredo Zayas.
- The Bulgarian Army occupied Demotika, Eastern Macedonia and Thrace.
- Pope Pius X sent a letter to Portuguese Roman Catholic clergy condemning Portugal's Law of Separation of the State and the Church (Lei da Separação do Estado das Igrejas) and censured those clergy who had accepted stipends under the law.
- The Germany to Russia Gordon Bennett Cup hot air balloon race, from Stuttgart to Moscow, was won by the French team of Maurice Bienaimé and René Rumpelmayer.
- In Warsaw, then part of the Russian Empire, Lieutenant Dahm of the Imperial German Army was sentenced to five years hard labor for espionage.
- A federal grand jury in Omaha, Nebraska, indicted five railroads for illegal rebate policies in violation of the Elkins Act.
- The last of the cattle from the XIT Ranch, once one of the largest in the Texas Panhandle at 150,000 head, were sold off at auction.
- Born: Gunther Plaut, German-born Canadian rabbi and author, president of the Canadian Jewish Congress 1977–1980, and recipient of the Order of Canada; as Wolf Gunter Plaut, in Münster, German Empire(d. 2012)
- Died: Homer Lea, 35, American writer, advisor to Sun Yat-sen during the 1911 Revolution, died of Bright's disease (b. 1876)

== November 2, 1912 (Saturday) ==
- The Ottoman Army retreated to Çatalca, Turkey, ending the Battle of Lule Burgas at a cost of 22,000 killed or wounded for the Ottoman Empire.
- King Peter of Serbia entered Uskub (now Skopje) after it was captured from the Ottoman Empire during the First Balkan War.
- Former Ottoman Sultan Abdul Hamid II was taken to Constantinople from Salonika.
- Royal Navy battleships and destroyers were ordered to Turkish waters.
- Adolfo Díaz, who had been named President of Nicaragua by the National Assembly in October 1911, was elected by popular vote, without opposition.
- Three days before the presidential election, candidate Woodrow Wilson sustained a head injury when his limousine struck a hole in the street and threw him against the car's ceiling. The accident took place in Hightstown, New Jersey, at the intersection of Main Street and Monmouth Street, and although the impact was hard enough that his glasses were broken, no stitches were required to close the wound.
- Ottoman Army troops rallied at Tcherkesskeui in the Marmara Region.
- An explosion on the battleship USS Vermont near Norfolk, Virginia, killed two men and seriously injured another four people.
- The first airplane flights in Japan by Imperial Japanese Navy personnel were made by two officers at Yokosuka Naval Air Technical Arsenal using Farman and Curtiss seaplanes.

== November 3, 1912 (Sunday) ==
- At Urga, Mongolia, the Russian Empire concluded a treaty with the country. The Russian Minister to China, Ivan Korostovets negotiated a pact with Mongolia's Foreign Minister, Mijiddorjin Khanddorj. In return for Russia's recognition of "Outer Mongolia" as an autonomous state to be protected from China, the Mongolian government would give Russia "most favored nation" status for trade and mining and timber rights.
- The Turkish government appealed to the Great Powers (France, Germany, and the United Kingdom) to intervene in the Balkan Wars, a claim which was rejected the next day by France.
- The Greek Army captured Preveza, Epirus.
- Louth beat Antrim 1–7 to 1–2 in the final for the All-Ireland Senior Football Championship in front of a crowd of 13,000 spectators at Jones Road in Dublin.
- Born:
  - Alfredo Stroessner, President of Paraguay and dictator from 1954 to 1989; in Encarnación, Paraguay (d. 2006)
  - Marie-Claude Vaillant-Couturier, French partisan fighter, member of the French Resistance during World War II, recipient of the Legion of Honour; as Marie-Claude Vogel, in Paris (d. 1996)

== November 4, 1912 (Monday) ==
- The British House of Commons rejected, by a vote of 265–162, a proposed amendment to the Home Rule Bill that would have set up proportional representation for an Irish legislature.
- The Greek Army captured Yenidje, Central Macedonia.
- French Astronomer Alphonse Borrelly discovered a new comet while observing at Marseille.
- The keel was laid for USS Nevada at Fore River Shipyard in Quincy, Massachusetts.
- A rail line of 18 miles 72 chains (30.4 kilometres) in length opened between Zeerust and Ottoshoop in Transvaal, South Africa.
- Born: Vadim Salmanov, Soviet composer, known for his collaborations with conductor Yevgeny Mravinsky; in Saint Petersburg, Russian Empire (d. 1978)

== November 5, 1912 (Tuesday) ==
- Woodrow Wilson was elected President of the United States, with former U.S. President Theodore Roosevelt and incumbent U.S. President William Howard Taft finishing in second and third place, respectively. Several state elections were also held with the following results:
  - Democrat Park Trammell was elected to state governor of Florida.
  - Democrat Edward Fitzsimmons Dunne defeated Republican incumbent Charles S. Deneen for governorship of Illinois.
  - Democrat Woodbridge N. Ferris was elected governor of Michigan.
  - Republican Adolph Olson Eberhart was elected governor of Minnesota.
  - Democrat Elliot Woolfolk Major defeated Republican candidate John C. McKinley for state governor of Missouri.
  - Democrat incumbent Coleman Livingston Blease was re-elected state governor of South Carolina.
  - Republican Frank M. Byrne defeated Democrat Edwin S. Johnson for state governor of South Dakota.
  - Republican Henry D. Hatfield was elected governor of West Virginia.
- Arizona, Kansas, Michigan and Oregon became the latest states to approve women's suffrage in state and local elections, but Wisconsin's men rejected the right of women to vote.
- In the Battle of Monastir, Serbian forces under the command of General Radomir Putnik inflicted heavy casualties on Turkish forces, with the Turks losing more than half of their battle force, having 25,000 killed and wounded, and 2,000 taken prisoner.
- The Greek Army captured Prilep, Macedonia.
- Wheeler County, Georgia, was created from the western section of Montgomery County by approval of voters for an amendment to the state constitution. On November 14, the town of Alamo would become the county seat.

== November 6, 1912 (Wednesday) ==
- Turkish Grand Vizier Kâmil Pasha summoned the Council of Ministers and Generals for a meeting at Istanbul to decide whether to continue the war with the Balkan League or seek peace. The Council elected to continue the war.
- Ottoman forces defeated Greek forces near what is now Amyntaio, Greece.
- Born:
  - George Cakobau, Fijian state leader, Governor-General of Fiji 1973 to 1983; on the island of Bau, Colony of Fiji, British Empire (d. 1989)
  - Vashti McCollum, American activist, advocated for separation of church and state as plaintiff in McCollum v. Board of Education, which struck down religious instruction in American public schools; as Vashti Cromwell, in Lyons, New York (d. 2006)

== November 7, 1912 (Thursday) ==
- Jack Johnson, the reigning world heavyweight boxing champion and controversial African American athlete, was indicted by a federal grand jury in Chicago for violation of the Mann Act. Belle Schreiber, a white prostitute, testified that Johnson had arranged for her railroad trip from Chicago to Pittsburgh for immoral purposes. Johnson was convicted six months later, and fled to France. He eventually served a one-year sentence in 1920 at the federal penitentiary in Leavenworth, Kansas.
- The largest French battleship, France, was launched from the shipyard at Saint-Nazaire, France.
- The silent film drama The Honor of the Family was released by the Rex Motion Picture Company. The film was supposedly the film debut of Lon Chaney, but could not be confirmed as the film and production and casting notes have been lost.
- The Manx English play The Charm by Christopher R. Shimmin was first performed by The Peel Players on the Isle of Man.
- Ernest Riebe's cartoon, Mr. Block, made its debut in The Industrial Worker.
- Born: Henry Evans, Australian-born New Zealand geologist, known for discovering major bauxite in the Australian area of Weipa; in Greymouth, South Island, Australia (d. 1990)

== November 8, 1912 (Friday) ==
- The Greek Army reached the Aegean Sea port city of Salonika (in Turkish, Selanik) hours ahead of the Bulgarian Army, and, at 8:00 pm local time, arranged terms of surrender of the city by Ottoman Empire forces without firing a shot. Although Salonika was prepared for an attack from the sea, it had no fortification to defend against an assault from the surrounding land. Both Bulgaria and Greece had historical claims to the port city, which had been Thessalonica in ancient Greece, and Solun in the Bulgarian Empire in medieval times; "the Bulgarians were outraged at having been deprived of their prize", which would have given Bulgaria a port on the Aegean and access to the Mediterranean Sea, and the loss of Salonika would lead to the Second Balkan War, with Bulgaria fighting Greece and Serbia.
- Born: June Havoc (stage name for Ellen Evangeline Hovick), Canadian-born American film and television actress, known for film roles including Gentleman's Agreement, daughter to Rose Thompson Hovick and sister to Gypsy Rose Lee; in Vancouver (d. 2010)

== November 9, 1912 (Saturday) ==
- A rail line of 132 miles 21 chains (212.9 kilometres) in length opened between Newington and Tzaneen in Transvaal, South Africa.
- Led by Jim Thorpe, the Carlisle Indians defeated the Army Cadets, 27–6, in a college football game at West Point, New York. Future U.S. President Dwight D. Eisenhower, playing for Army, tackled Thorpe and forced a fumble. Later in the game, Eisenhower injured his right knee while attempting to bring down Thorpe again.
- Died: Mahuta Tāwhiao, 58, New Zealand indigenous noble, King of the Māori people since 1894 (b. 1855). He was succeeded by his son, Te Rata Mahuta

== November 10, 1912 (Sunday) ==
- The Far Eastern Party, consisting of Douglas Mawson, Xavier Mertz, Belgrave Edward Sutton Ninnis, and 17 husky dogs, set off from their camp to begin a disastrous surveying trip of the unexplored George V Land in Antarctica as part of the Australasian Antarctic Expedition. Ninnis and most of the team's supplies would disappear into a crevasse on December 14, and Mertz would die of malnutrition in January, but an emaciated Mawson would survive to return to camp by February 8, and live until 1958.
- The final major storm of the season began to form in the Caribbean Sea south of Hispaniola.
- Born:
  - Jean-Hilaire Aubame, Gabonese politician, cabinet minister to the Léon M'ba administration; in Libreville, French Equatorial Africa (d. 1989)
  - Birdie Tebbetts, American major league baseball catcher in the American League from 1936 to 1952, later the manager of the Cincinnati Reds, Milwaukee Braves and the Cleveland Indians; as George Robert Tebbetts, in Burlington, Vermont, United States (d. 1999)
- Died:
  - Ramón Corral, 58, Vice President of Mexico from 1904 to 1911, died of cancer (b. 1854).
  - Louis Cyr, 49, Canadian strongman, credited by the International Federation of BodyBuilding & Fitness as the strongest man who ever lived, died of chronic nephritis (b. 1863).
  - Julius Wayland, 58, American newspaper publisher and activist, founder of Appeal to Reason which promoted socialism, committed suicide (b. 1854)

== November 11, 1912 (Monday) ==
- Eighteen people were killed and 90 injured in a railroad crash at Yazoo City, Mississippi.
- Chile and Peru resumed diplomatic relations that had been severed in 1910.
- The tropical storm that started in the Caribbean Sea was officially recorded as it moved past Cacique, Colón in Panama.
- British physicist Lawrence Bragg presented his derivation of Bragg's law for the angles for coherent and incoherent scattering from a crystal to the Cambridge Philosophical Society.
- Japanese Government Railways extended the Echigo Line in the Niigata Prefecture, Japan, with stations Hisumi, Arahama, Kariwa, Nishiyama, and Ishiji serving the line.
- Born:
  - Larry LaPrise, American songwriter, best known for the popular song "The Hokey Pokey"; in Detroit (d. 1996)
  - Cassius Marcellus Clay Sr., American painter, father of boxing champion Muhammad Ali; in Louisville, Kentucky (d. 1990)
- Died: Ridgley C. Powers, 75, American politician from Ohio, Governor of Mississippi during the Reconstruction Era, 1871 to 1874 (b. 1836)

== November 12, 1912 (Tuesday) ==
- A search party led by Edward L. Atkinson found the bodies of Captain Robert Falcon Scott and his fellow Antarctic explorers on the British Terra Nova Expedition. Party member C. S. Wright spotted a bamboo pole in the snow. The search party found the frozen bodies of Scott, "Birdie" Bowers and Edward Wilson in a tent buried beneath the snow, along with their journals, undeveloped film and supplies. The news would not reach the rest of the world until February 11, 1913.
- Lieutenant Yōzō Kaneko performed a public demonstration of naval flight for the Imperial Japanese Navy fleet review at Yokohama, Japan, piloting a Farman seaplane while accompanied by Lieutenant Sankichi Kōno who flew a Curtiss seaplane.
- A months-long strike among miners in Waihi, New Zealand turned violent when police and non-union miners attempted to raid the miners' union hall. Union worker Fred Evans exchanged gunfire with the police, wounding a police officer and another non-union miner before a constable subdued him with a blow to the head. Evans never recovered from the blow and died the following day from the head injury.
- Two American cruisers, USS Montana and USS Tennessee, were sent to the Mediterranean Sea to protect American citizens during the Balkan Wars.

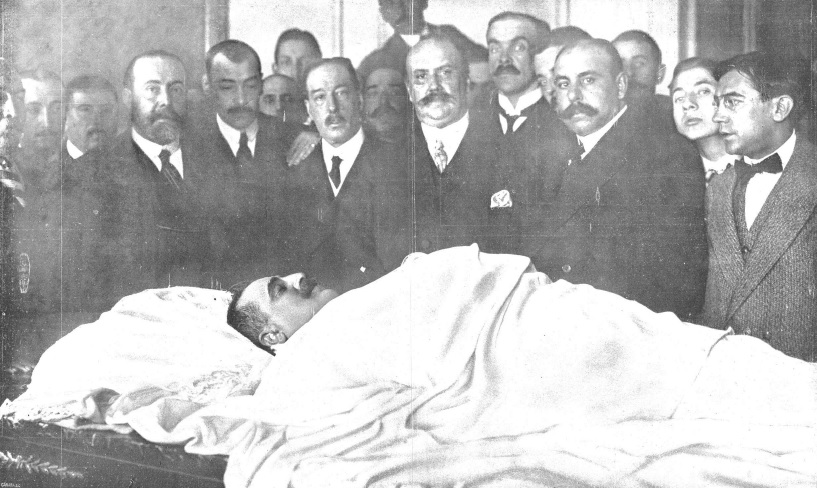
November 12, 1912: José Canalejas after his assassination

- In Madrid, anarchist Manuel Pardiñas assassinated José Canalejas, the Prime Minister of Spain, and then shot himself to death. Canalejas had stopped in front of a bookstore when Pardiñas fired three shots at close range from a Browning pistol.
- The Manchester Guardian published the first news story about the Piltdown Man, which reported the discovery by Charles Dawson in southern England of the earliest known ancestor of man under the headline, "The Earliest Man? A Skull Millions of Years Old- One of the Most Important of Our Time". The discovery would be exposed as a hoax in 1953.

== November 13, 1912 (Wednesday) ==
- China's Foreign Minister Liang Men Ting resigned in protest over the government's handling of Mongolia's treaty with Russia.
- Fifteen people were killed and 20 injured in a railway accident at Irvington, Indiana, a suburb of Indianapolis. Train No. 36 of the Cincinnati, Hamilton & Dayton Railway was speeding from Cincinnati to Chicago when it collided with a freight train.
- The tropical storm strengthened to a Category 1 hurricane as it moved east of Nicaragua.
- Film actor and producer Helen Gardner released Cleopatra, her first film through her company The Helen Gardner Picture Players in Tappan, New York. The film was adapted from a play by Victorien Sardou and featured Gardner in the title role, the first feature-length film to feature the Egyptian monarch.
- The musical The Red Petticoat by Rida Johnson Young and Jerome Kern, opened at the Daly's 30th St. Theatre in New York City and ran for only 61 performances.
- A statue commemorating Chief Seattle was formally unveiled by his great-great-granddaughter Myrtle Loughery in Tilikum Place, Seattle.
- Born: Claude Pompidou, French philanthropist, co-founder of Centre Pompidou, wife of French President Georges Pompidou; as Claude Jacqueline Cahour, in Château-Gontier, Mayenne département (d. 2007)

== November 14, 1912 (Thursday) ==
- Álvaro Figueroa Torres, the Count of Romanones, was appointed as the new Prime Minister of Spain.
- The Pennsylvania Railroad’s premier Chicago to New York train was christened the Broadway Limited (named for the railroad’s four-track main line, not the New York City Theater District).
- The city of Eldoret was created by European settlers in British East Africa, and named after the Maasai language word for a stony river.
- Born:
  - Barbara Hutton, American socialite, heiress to the Woolworth fortune, sometimes dubbed the "Poor Little Rich Girl"; in New York City (d. 1979)
  - Tung-Yen Lin, Chinese-born American engineer, developed prestressed concrete, in Fuzhou, Fujian province, Republic of China (d. 2003)

== November 15, 1912 (Friday) ==
- Turkish Grand Vizier Kâmil Pasha proposed to King Ferdinand of Bulgaria to negotiate a ceasefire and peace between the two nations, while Greece, Serbia and Montenegro continued to advance on all fronts.
- Vincent Astor reached his 21st birthday and inherited the fortune of his father, John Astor, who had died exactly seven months earlier in the sinking of the Titanic. The $150,000,000 bequest under Astor's will would be the equivalent of 3.4 billion dollars in 2012.
- The Genesee Valley Canal Railroad merged with another rail line to form the Pennsylvania and Rochester Railroad in New York.
- Born:
  - Albert Baez, Mexican-born American physicist, contributor to the development of the X-ray microscope, father of singers Joan Baez and Mimi Fariña; in Puebla de Zaragoza, state of Puebla (d. 2007)
  - Jacob DeShazer, U.S. Air Force pilot, member of the Doolittle Raid on Tokyo, recipient of the Distinguished Flying Cross; in West Stayton, Oregon (d. 2008)

== November 16, 1912 (Saturday) ==
- The Napoleonic Code was amended in France to provide for recognition of paternity of illegitimate children.
- The Bober River dam was inaugurated by Kaiser Wilhelm near the village of Mauer in Silesia (now the dam over the Bóbr River at Pilchowice in Poland).

== November 17, 1912 (Sunday) ==
- Turkey halted an invasion by Bulgaria at the First Battle of Çatalca, less than 20 miles from the capital at Istanbul. Because of the heavy casualties sustained by the invaders, the Bulgarian General Staff abandoned its plans during the First Balkan War to capture Istanbul (Constantinople) or Adrianople.
- Kilkenny successfully defended their All-Ireland Senior Hurling Championship title against Cork, defeating them 2–1 to 1–3 in the final before a crowd of 18,000 spectators at Jones Road in Dublin.
- Franz Kafka began writing his famous novella The Metamorphosis, in German under the title "Die Verwandlung".
- Composer Igor Stravinsky completed the writing of the musical score for the well-known ballet The Rite of Spring (Le Sacre du Printemps).
- Born:
  - Charles "Bebe" Rebozo, American business leader, founder of the Key Biscayne Bank & Trust, best friend and confidant of U.S. President Richard Nixon; in Tampa, Florida (d. 1998)
  - Jack Lescoulie, American broadcaster, host of NBC's Today; in Sacramento, California (d. 1987)
- Died: Richard Norman Shaw, 81, Scottish architect, best known for his planning design for Bedford Park, London (b. 1831)

== November 18, 1912 (Monday) ==
- A volunteer Greek force under command of Spyros Spyromilios overthrew local Ottoman authorities in the Himara coast along the Ionian Sea (now part of southern Albania).
- Personnel from various foreign navies landed at Istanbul to protect their citizens residing in Turkey.
- The hurricane in the Caribbean strengthened to Category 3 with wind speeds recorded at 115 mph (185 km/h) when it hit the western coast of Jamaica. The heavy winds combined with heavy rain caused extensive flooding, destroying some 5,000 buildings and causing a 25% loss of banana tree crops. Montego Bay was hit particularly hard, with 42 killed and another 300 left homeless.
- Hong Kong Governor Francis Henry May directed the British colony's two streetcar companies and the Star Ferry company to stop accepting Chinese coins for payment of its fares, and to accept only Hong Kong coins. Since there were relatively few Hong Kong coins in circulation, many passengers were unable to pay their fares and the response was a public boycott of mass transportation. Ultimately, Governor May would succeed in ridding the colony of foreign coinage and currency.
- Cotton County, Oklahoma, was created from the southern portion of Comanche County.
- Born:
  - Vic Hey, Australian rugby player, five-eighth for the Western Suburbs Magpies, Leeds Rhinos, Dewsbury Rams and Australia national rugby league team from 1929 to 1949; in Liverpool, New South Wales (d. 1995)
  - Hilda Nickson, British romance writer, author of over 60 romance novels and vice-president of the Romantic Novelists' Association, wife to writer Arthur Nickson; as Hilda Pressley in Maltby, England (d. 1977)
- Died: Richard Edward O'Connor, 61, Australian judge, third Justice of the High Court of Australia (b. 1851)

== November 19, 1912 (Tuesday) ==
- An earthquake killed more than 70 people in and around Acambay, Mexico. Most died in the collapse of a church, where the victims were women attending mass, and the male priests.
- The Balkan League telegraphed to the Ottoman Empire their terms for a peace treaty.
- A vastly superior Serbian force of over 100,000 men overwhelmed an Ottoman force of 38,000 men at Bitola, Macedonia.
- Eighteen people were killed in a railway accident at Gull Lake, Ontario.
- Born: George Emil Palade, Romanian-born American microbiologist, 1974 recipient of the Nobel Prize in Physiology or Medicine for developing the electron microscope; in Iași (d. 2008)

== November 20, 1912 (Wednesday) ==
- A ceasefire on the Chatalja line between Bulgaria and Turkey took effect while peace terms were discussed.
- The hurricane that struck Jamaica two days earlier weakened to a minor storm south of Cuba before dissipating two days later north on Honduras. In total, the storm killed 105 people throughout the Caribbean and causing $1.5 million (1912 USD) in property damage, with most of the damage and casualties in Jamaica.
- Lieutenant Charles Becker and three other persons were found guilty of the murder of Herman Rosenthal.
- Pietro Bertolini was appointed as the first Minister of the Colonies for Italy, due to the recent acquisition of Tripolitania, Cyrenaica, and the Dodecanese Islands.
- The History of Medicine Society held its first meeting, under the chairmanship of Sir William Osler, in London with 160 people in attendance.
- Born:
  - Otto von Habsburg, Austrian royal and the last Crown Prince of Austria-Hungary, pretender to the throne 1922 until 1961, and later a member of the European Parliament from 1979 to 1999; at Castle Wartholz in Reichenau an der Rax, Austria-Hungary (d. 2011)
  - Ram Gopal, Indian dancer, promoter of Indian classical dance in the west; as Bissano Ram Gopal, in Bangalore, Princely State of Mysore, British India (now the Indian state of Karnataka (d. 2003)

== November 21, 1912 (Thursday) ==
- The Turkish government rejected the Balkan League's terms for peace as unacceptable, and war resumed on all fronts.
- In what one historian would later describe as "the greatest victory in the history of the Bulgarian navy," four torpedo boats attacked the Ottoman Empire cruiser Hamidiye on the Black Sea "and scored at least one hit", causing some casualties and some damage to the bow.
- The Imperial Japanese Navy battleship Hiei was launched. On November 13, 1942, in the Battle of Guadalcanal, it would become the first Japanese battleship to face American ships in war, and the first ever to be sunk.
- Born:
  - Abd al-Aziz Ibn Baz, Saudi theologian, Grand Mufti of Saudi Arabia from 1993 until his death; in Riyadh, Emirate of Riyadh (d. 1999)
  - Eleanor Powell, American film actress and dancer, known for tap dance routines for musical films including Broadway Melody of 1938 and Born to Dance; in Springfield, Massachusetts(d. 1982)

== November 22, 1912 (Friday) ==
- The Entente Cordiale, military alliance between the United Kingdom and France, was strengthened by an exchange of notes between French Ambassador Paul Cambon and the British Foreign Secretary, Sir Edward Grey, providing for joint action in the event of war.
- The Nigerian Protectorate Order was signed by King George at Windsor Castle, unifying the Northern Nigeria Protectorate and the colony of Southern Nigeria, effective January 1, 1914. Sir Frederick Lugard became Governor of both entities prior to the merger and would become the first Governor-General of Nigeria.
- Native chiefs were arrested by British colonial authorities in Sierra Leone to halt the cannibalistic human leopard practice.
- John Flammang Schrank, who had shot and wounded former U.S. President Theodore Roosevelt on October 14, was found to be insane by a board of five physicians in Milwaukee, who wrote that Schrank was "suffering from insane delusions, grandiose in character and of a systematized variety... we are of the opinion he is unable to converse intelligently with counsel on the conduct of his defense."
- Sports club Deportivo Cali was established in Cali, Colombia, where it eventually developed its successful association football program for Categoría Primera A.
- Born: Doris Duke, American socialite and philanthropist, daughter to James Buchanan Duke, known for her foundations including the Newport Restoration Foundation and Duke University AIDS research foundation; in New York City (d. 1993)
- Died: Otto Lessing, 56, German sculptor, best known for his interior designs and architectural sculptures for the Reichstag building, Berlin Cathedral, and Reichsgericht in Berlin (b. 1846)

== November 23, 1912 (Saturday) ==
- The freighter Rouse Simmons, carrying a cargo of Christmas trees, sank in a violent ice storm on Lake Michigan, taking all 16 of its passengers and crew with it. Its wreckage would be discovered in 1971.
- Eugene V. Debs, who had recently run for President of the United States on the Socialist Party ticket, was indicted by a federal grand jury in Fort Scott, Kansas, on charges of obstruction of justice. Charged also were Fred D. Warren, editor of the Girard, Kansas, newspaper The Appeal to Reason, and Warren's lawyer, J. I. Sheppard. All three were accused of having paid $200 to a federal witness, to induce him to avoid testifying in their trial for misuse of the postal system.
- Revolutionary syndicalist organizations in Italy leave the Confederazione Generale del Lavoro trade union and form the Unione Sindacale Italiana.
- At New Haven, Connecticut, unbeaten and untied Harvard University (8–0–0) visited unbeaten Yale University (7–0–1) for what would prove to be the championship of the 1912 college football season. Wisconsin and Penn State would also finish the season with perfect records.
- South Africa beat Scotland 16–0 in a rugby union test match in Inverleith, Scotland during their European tour.
- The drama The Eldest Son by John Galsworthy opened at the Kingsway Theatre in London and ran for 47 performances.
- Born:
  - Tyree Glenn, American jazz musician, trombone player for Duke Ellington and Louis Armstrong; in Corsicana, Texas (d. 1974)
  - George O'Hanlon, American actor, best known as the voice of George Jetson in the television animated series The Jetsons; in New York City (d. 1989)
  - Virginia Prince, American activist, founder of the Society for the Second Self which advocated transgender rights; in Los Angeles (d. 2009)
- Died: Charles Bourseul, 83, Belgian engineer who developed the concepts that led to the invention of the telephone (b. 1829)

== November 24, 1912 (Sunday) ==
- Forty-four people were killed and 60 injured in a mass panic at a movie theater in Bilbao, Spain.
- Twenty-four miners were killed at Alais, France. The death toll would have been higher had the blast not occurred between shifts.
- Te Rata was crowned as the new King of the Māori people in New Zealand.
- Born: Teddy Wilson, American jazz musician, pianist for Louis Armstrong, Lena Horne, Benny Goodman, Billie Holiday, and Ella Fitzgerald; in Austin, Texas (d. 1986)

== November 25, 1912 (Monday) ==
- William Merlaud-Ponty, the colonial governor-general of French West Africa, ruled that the drafting of Africans into forced labor (prestations) would be allowed in order to build the colony's infrastructure.
- An explosion at a starch factory in Waukegan, Illinois, killed 8 people and injured 27, while four other employees of the Corn Products Company were missing.
- Three delegates each from Bulgaria and the Ottoman Empire met at the Turkish town of Bahçeköy, near Çatalca, Turkey to discuss peace. Nazim Pasha, the commander of the Turkish forces, shook hands with his counterpart, General Savoff of Bulgaria.
- A cyclone destroyed Tacloban, the capital of the Leyte island in the Philippines, and killed 310 people on the islands of Samar, Leyte and North Fanay.
- The first trade union ever founded in China was created by the nation's goldsmiths.
- Românul de la Pind, the longest-running newspaper by and about Aromanians until World War II, ceased publication.
- Born: Francis Durbridge, English writer, best known for his Paul Temple detective series; in Kingston upon Hull, Yorkshire (d. 1998)
- Died: Isidor Rayner, 62, U.S. Senator for Maryland since 1887 (b. 1850)

== November 26, 1912 (Tuesday) ==
- Eleven men, of the Imperial Russian Navy's Black Sea Fleet, were executed at Sevastopol after being convicted of mutiny.
- Amoako Atta III, King of the Akyem Abuakwa state in Ghana, was removed from office by British colonial authorities.
- In Salem, Massachusetts, leaders of the Lawrence textile strike were acquitted of charges of murder resulting from the strike. Joseph Caruso had been indicted for the killing of Anna LoPizzo, who died during a strike-related riot, and Joseph J. Ettor and Arturo Giovannitti had been charged as accessories for conspiracy to incite the January 12 riot.
- Born: Eric Sevareid, American journalist, member of the Murrow Boys and anchor for CBS Evening News; in Velva, North Dakota (d. 1992)
- Died:
  - John T. Brush, 67, American sports executive, owner of the National League's Indianapolis Hoosiers, 1886 to 1889, then the Cincinnati Reds from 1890 to 1902 (b. 1845)
  - Robert Knight, 86, American industrialist, co-founder of the Fruit of the Loom undergarment manufacturer (b. 1826)
  - Princess Marie of Hohenzollern-Sigmaringen, 67, Belgian noble, Countess of Flanders and mother of King Albert I of Belgium (b. 1845)

== November 27, 1912 (Wednesday) ==
- France and Spain signed a treaty dividing Morocco into two separate protectorates, with a 350 square mile zone around Tangier being an "international zone." Spain's holdings would be administered from Tétouan and consist of 20,000 square km in the north and 23,000 in the south.
- Bulgarian forces defeated Ottoman troops near what is now Peplos, Evros, Greece.
- Sir Edward Henry, the Police Commissioner for London, was wounded by a man who shot him three times as the chief was returning from Scotland Yard to his residence in Kensington. The attacker, identified as a Mr. Bowes, had been denied a license to operate a taxicab and was angered that Chief Henry would not reconsider the ruling.

== November 28, 1912 (Thursday) ==
- The Albanian Declaration of Independence was made by 83 delegates to the All-Albanian Congress at the Ottoman Empire city of Vlorë, bringing an end to more than 400 years of Turkish rule. Between 1393 and 1501, Ottoman forces had incorporated the Albanian homeland into the Empire. Ismail Qemali, an Albanian who had served as an Ottoman colonial governor for Tripolitania, was proclaimed the leader of the new nation.
- General Yaver Pasha and 9,000 Turkish troops surrendered to the Bulgarian Army at Dedeagach. Bulgaria would later lose the territory to Greece in World War I, and the city would be renamed Alexandroupoli.
- General Mehmet Esat Bülkat and his force of 10,000 Ottoman troops defeated a Greek force of 3,800 at Driskos in the Ottoman-held territory of what is now northern Greece.
- Ad Wolgast lost his World Lightweight Championship to Willie Ritchie following a 16th round foul at Colma, California. Ritchie held onto the title until 1914.
- St. Anthony of Padua Church was dedicated in New Bedford, Massachusetts.
- Born:
  - Morris Louis, American painter, member of the Washington Color School movement; as Morris Louis Bernstein, in Baltimore (d. 1962)
  - Alan Gewirth, American philosopher, promoter of moral rationalism in the United States, author of Reason and Morality; in Union City, New Jersey (d. 2004)
- Died: Walter Benona Sharp, 41, American industrialist, co-founder of the Sharp-Hughes Tool Company (b. 1870)

== November 29, 1912 (Friday) ==
- In College Park, Maryland, most of Maryland Agricultural College was destroyed by fire, with all of the dormitories and administration buildings, and most of the classrooms of being devastated. The college would rebuild, become a coeducational institution with the admission of women students, be renamed the University of Maryland in 1920, and grow to become one of the leading public universities in the United States.
- Greek poet Lorentzos Mavilis, 52, who had volunteered for the Greek Army to fight in the First Balkan War, was killed in battle at Driskos. Reportedly, his last words were, "I expected many honors from this war, but not the added honor that I offer my life for my Greece."
- Born: John Templeton, American-British business leader and philanthropist, founder of the Templeton Growth Fund and Templeton College at the University of Oxford; in Winchester, Tennessee (d. 2008)

== November 30, 1912 (Saturday) ==
- Eladio Victoria resigned as President of the Dominican Republic and was replaced by the Archbishop of Santo Domingo, Monsignor Adolfo Alejandro Nouel, who pledged to organize free elections under the supervision of the United States. As a result, most hostilities in the country's civil war effectively ended.
- A.E.B. Danquah was installed by British authorities in Ghana as King Ofori Atta I to rule the Akyem Abuakwa state. As the first literate monarch in Ghana, he would reign until 1943.
- The Waihi miners' strike ended in New Zealand.
- The Hamilton Alerts defeated the Toronto Argonauts 11–4 to win the 4th Grey Cup, the only time the club won the Canadian football championship.
- South Africa shut out Ireland 38–0 in a rugby union test match in Dublin during their European tour.
- Born:
  - Hugo del Carril, Argentine actor, film director and singer, known for films including Dark River; as Pierre Bruno Hugo Fontana, in Buenos Aires (d. 1989)
  - Nihat Erim, Prime Minister of Turkey 1971 to 1972; as İsmail Nihat Erim, in Kandıra, Ottoman Empire (assassinated, 1980)
  - Gordon Parks, American photographer and film director who covered the civil rights movement for Life magazine, and directed films including Shaft and The Learning Tree; in Fort Scott, Kansas (d. 2006)
- Died:
  - Dharmavaram Ramakrishnamacharyulu, 60, Indian playwright, author of more than 30 original plays in the Telugu language (b. 1853)
  - Robert Collyer, 88, British-American clergy, first minister of the First Unitarian Church of Chicago, early supporter of women's suffrage (b. 1823)
