= October 1912 =

Month of 1912

<<	October 1912					>>
Su	Mo	Tu	We	Th	Fr	Sa
		1	2	3	4	5
6	7	8	9	10	11	12
13	14	15	16	17	18	19
20	21	22	23	24	25	26
27	28	29	30	31

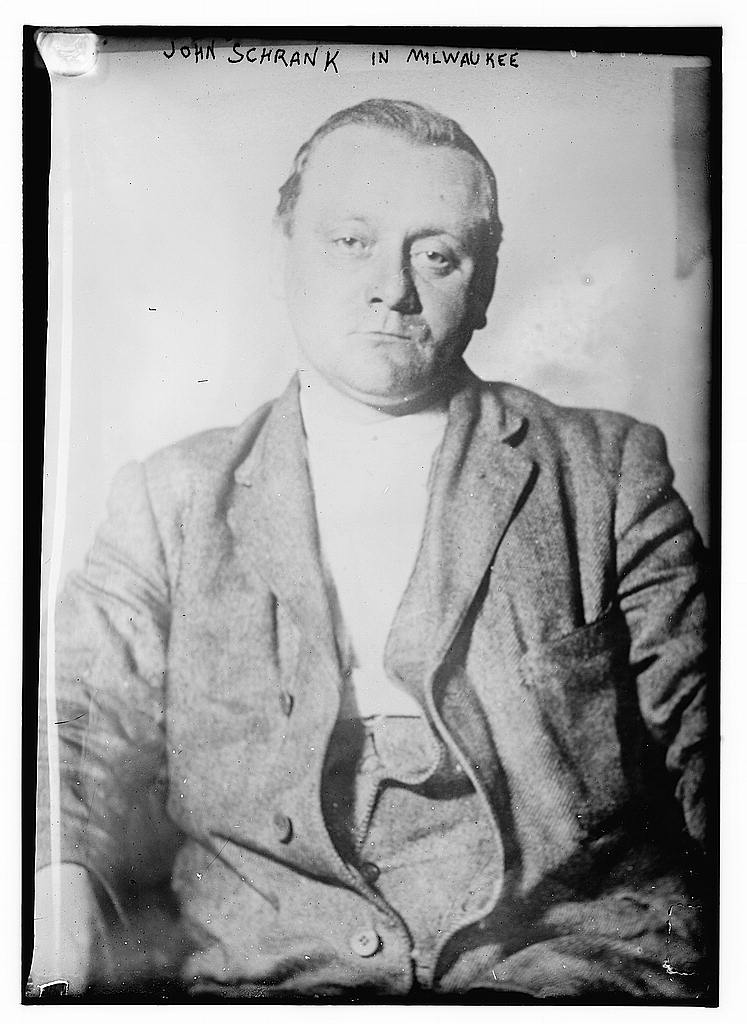
October 14, 1912: John Schrank shoots Theodore Roosevelt at Milwaukee

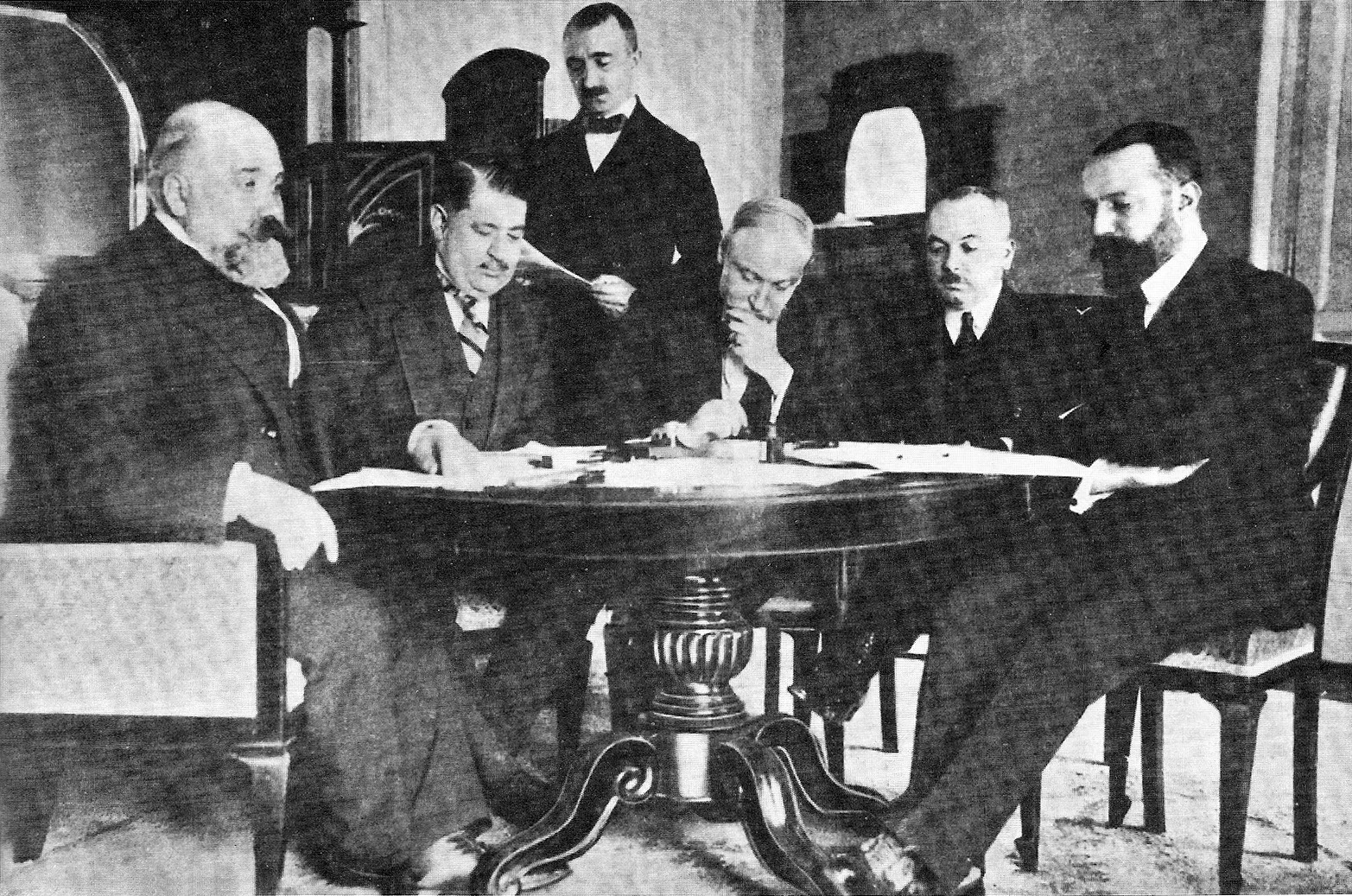
October 18, 1912: Turkey's war with Italy ended by treaty

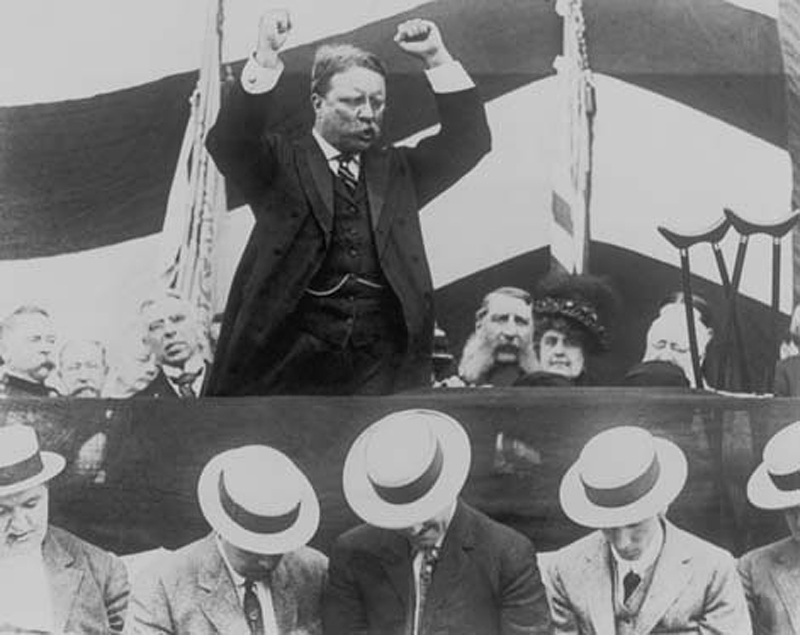
Roosevelt

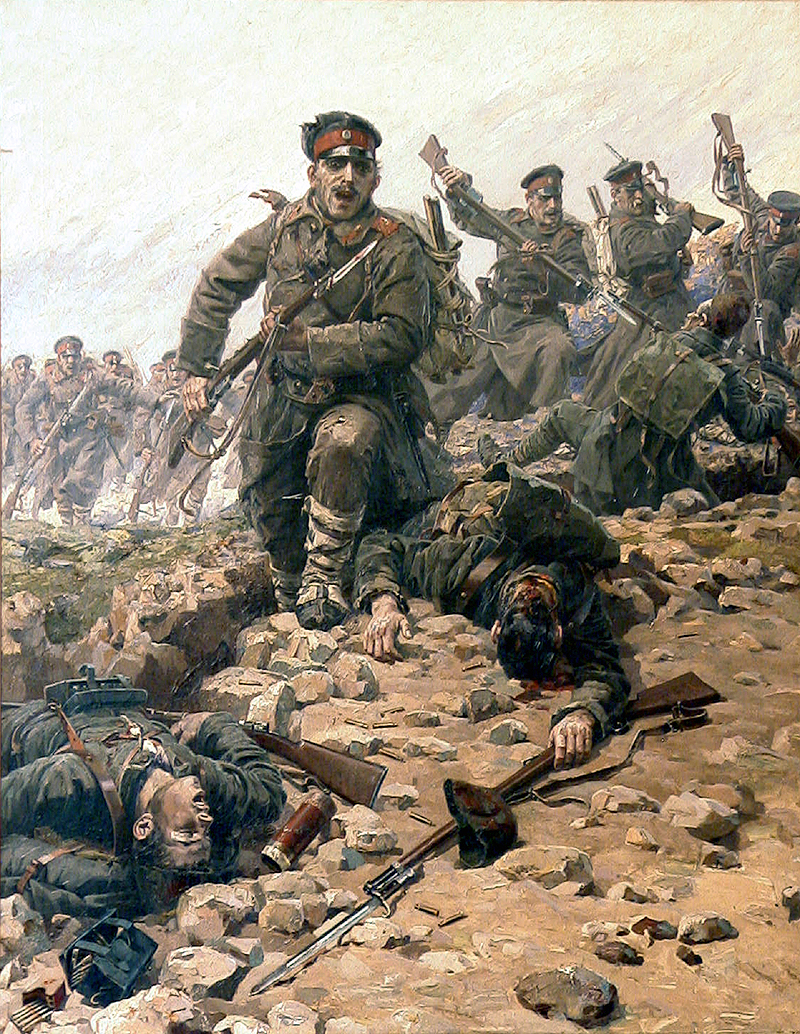
October 17, 1912: Turkey's war with Balkan League begins

The following events occurred in October 1912:

== October 1, 1912 (Tuesday) ==
- The capital of British India was formally moved to Delhi from Calcutta.
- Turkey and Greece both mobilized their armies in preparation of war.
- The tenth Salon d'Automne was held in Paris. Over 1,770 works were on display for over a month, with artists focused on Cubism given their own exhibit room as well a Cubist architecture installation by Raymond Duchamp-Villon titled La Maison Cubiste. Artistic works exhibited included paintings Dancer in a Café and Femme à l'Éventail by Jean Metzinger, Man on a Balcony, The Bathers, Harvest Threshing and Passy, Bridges of Paris by Albert Gleizes, The Spring by Francis Picabia, and sculptures Groupe de femmes and Danseuse by Joseph Csaky. Following the closing of the art event, Metzinger and Gleizes published On "Cubism", the first major text detailing the theory and techniques surrounding the emerging art movement.
- Edmund Knox, Bishop of Manchester, consecrated St John's Church in Great Harwood, Lancashire, England.
- Aboard the U.S. Navy destroyer USS Walke (DD-34), the port main turbine split open, killing five men.
- Born: Kathleen Ollerenshaw, British mathematician, known for research in order theory and abstract algebra; as Kathleen Timpson, in Withington, England (d. 2014)

== October 2, 1912 (Wednesday) ==
- Bulgarian troops seized control of Turkish blockhouses at Djuma-i-Bala district.
- Serbia, Montenegro, Greece and Bulgaria delivered an ultimatum to the Ottoman Empire over Macedonia.

== October 3, 1912 (Thursday) ==
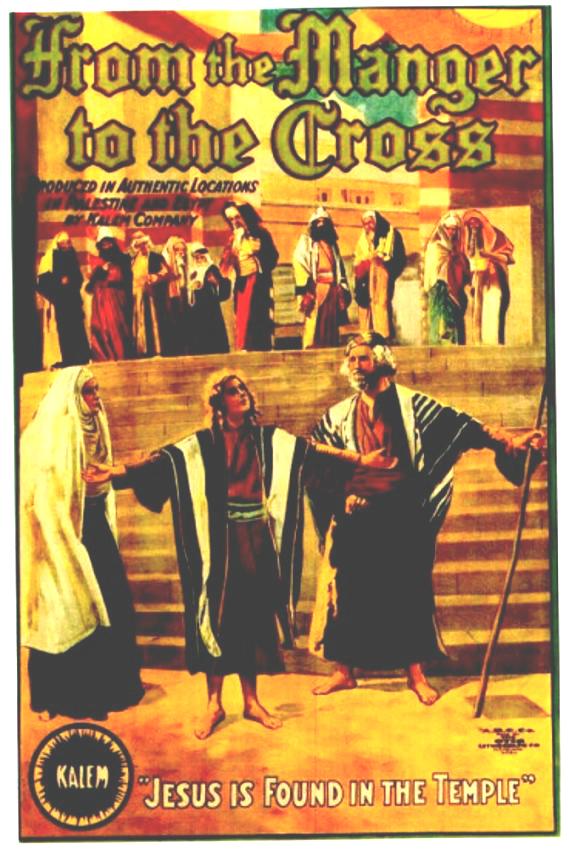
Poster for the American film From the Manger to the Cross

- General Smedley Butler and Colonel Joseph Henry Pendleton of the United States Marine Corps had given Nicaraguan rebel general Benjamín Zeledón an ultimatum to surrender the El Coyotepe fortress by 8:00 am or face bombardment by American artillery and then an invasion. The rebels refused to capitulate, and American shelling began minutes later.
- Turkish frontier guards attacked troops of Montenegro at Berane.
- Crowds in Constantinople demonstrated in favor of Turkey going to war with Bulgaria.
- The longest drought in U.S. history began in Bagdad in San Bernardino County, California. For the next 767 days, more than two years, no rain fell on the town in the Mojave Desert.
- From the Manger to the Cross, the silent film about Jesus, by Sidney Olcott, premiered in London, followed on October 10 by its New York City release and was the first to be filmed on location in the Holy Land.

== October 4, 1912 (Friday) ==
- Off the coast of Dover, the collision of the Royal Navy submarine HMS B2 with the Hamburg America Line ship Amerika killed 15 sailors. B2 was part of a flotilla of 13 submarines patrolling four miles from Dover as part of Royal Navy maneuvers, and crossed 60 feet (18 m) in front of the bow of Amerika, which was moving twice as fast and was unable to stop. Only one man, Lt. Richard I. Pulleyne, survived, swimming upward after the sub broke in two.
- The U.S. Marines attacked Nicaragua's rebels before dawn, advanced uphill and captured the fortress on El Coyotepe despite being fired on by the remaining rebels. Four Americans and 27 rebels were killed, and another 14 U.S. infantrymen wounded.
- Sixteen-year old black teen Ernest Knox and his friend were tried and convicted for the rape and murder of 18-year old white teen Sleety Mae Crow, in Forsyth County, Georgia. Despite evidence of Knox's confession to the crime pointed to him being under duress from local authorities, both black teens were sentenced to be executed by hanging, bringing an end to most of the immediate racial violence in the county.
- The first University of Calgary began classes, with a faculty of three professors. The Alberta provincial legislature would not give the University power to confer degrees, and the University of Alberta did not welcome the competition. As result, the university would close its doors in October 1915.
- Golfer Harry Vardon won a rematch against Ted Ray at the 10th News of the World Matchplay, beating him by one hole. Vardon lost his defending title to Ray at The Open Championship in June.

== October 5, 1912 (Saturday) ==
- French Prime Minister Raymond Poincaré addressed the British Foreign Office regarding averting war in the Balkans, with the assistance of Austria-Hungary and Russia.
- The parliaments of Bulgaria and Serbia met in extraordinary session to discuss going to war.
- Jack Zelig, a witness for the prosecution in the trial of New York City Police Department lieutenant Charles Becker, was shot and killed in New York City while preparing to board a trolley, two days before Becker's trial was to start.
- Carl Stearns Clancy, 22, began his quest to become the first person to take a motorcycle around the world, setting sail from Philadelphia to Dublin. He would complete the job on August 27, 1913, after 18,000 miles.
- The New York Highlanders played their final baseball game, ending a seven-game losing streak to defeat the Washington Senators 8–6, and finishing in last place in the American League with 50 wins and 102 losses. In 1913, the team would have a new manager, mostly new players, and a new name, as the New York Yankees.
- Born:
  - Karl Hass, German SS officer, perpetrator of the Ardeatine massacre in Italy in 1944; in Kiel (d. 2004)
  - Bora Laskin, Chief Justice of Canada from 1973 to 1984; in Fort William, Ontario (now Thunder Bay, Ontario) (d. 1984)
  - João Marinho Neto Brazilian supercentenarian, known for becoming the world's oldest man on November 25, 1914; in Maranguape, Ceará state (alive in 2026). As of January 2026, Neto was the 20th oldest person in the world, with 19 women older than him, alongside being the 20th oldest man in history.

== October 6, 1912 (Sunday) ==
- American troops captured the city of León, Nicaragua, effectively ending the insurgency in Nicaragua.
- Lieutenant Yōzō Kaneko made the first flight for the Imperial Japanese Navy at the Yokosuka Naval Air Technical Arsenal in Japan, piloting a Farman seaplane for 15 minutes and reaching an altitude of 30 meters (100 feet).
- Died:
  - Auguste Beernaert, 83, Belgian state leader, Prime Minister of Belgium 1884 to 1894 (b. 1829)
  - William A. Peffer, 81, U.S. Senator for Kansas from 1891 to 1897 as the first senator to be elected from the Populist Party (b. 1831)
  - Walter William Skeat, 76, English linguist, author of The English Dialect Dictionary (b. 1835)
  - Susie King Taylor, 64, American medical officer, the first African-American army nurse (b. 1848)

== October 7, 1912 (Monday) ==
- A proposed peace agreement to end the Italo-Turkish War was presented by Prime Minister Giovanni Giolitti to the Italian cabinet.
- Born: Fernando Belaúnde, President of Peru 1963-1968 and 1980-1985; as Fernando Sergio Marcelo Marcos Belaúnde Terry, in Lima, Peru (d. 2002)

== October 8, 1912 (Tuesday) ==
- The First Balkan War began as the tiny Kingdom of Montenegro declared war on the Ottoman Empire, with the army attacking Novi Pazar and the Detchitch fort across from Podgorica. Bulgaria, Serbia and Greece would join in on October 17, and the war would last until May 30, 1913, with Turkey giving up its European possessions under the Treaty of London.
- Died:
  - Wilhelm Kuhe, 88, Czech composer, known for his collaborations with Giuseppe Verdi (b. 1823)
  - Millie and Christine McKoy, 61, American singers, conjoined twins that toured as the musical act "The Carolina Twins" (b. 1851)

== October 9, 1912 (Wednesday) ==
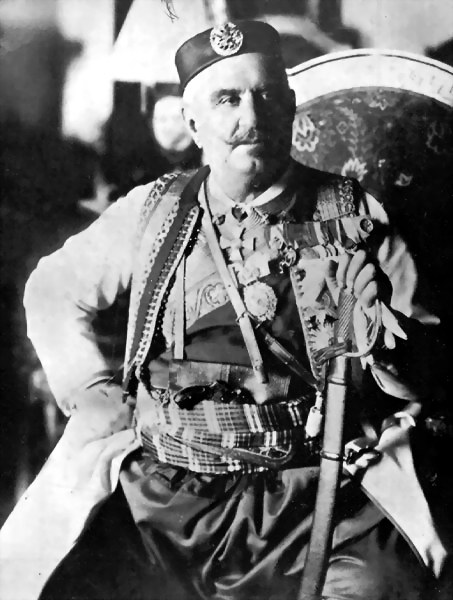
King Nicholas of Montenegro

- King Nicholas of Montenegro called on his subjects to join in a "holy war" against Turkey, as Detchitch fell to the Montenegrins.
- Romania assured Bulgaria of its neutrality.
- The second game of the World Series ended with no winner, with the teams tied 6-6 after 11 innings before darkness forced an early end, meaning that the second game would have to be replayed. The Boston Red Sox had won the first game, 4-3.

== October 10, 1912 (Thursday) ==
- The first major battle between Greece and the Ottoman Empire in the First Balkan War occurred at Sarantaporo (now part of Greece), with Greek forces capturing Servia and Kozani from the Ottomans.
- The Maternity Allowance Act was passed in Australia, granting a "baby bonus" of five pounds to the mother of every child born in the country, except the coverage did not include indigenous mothers and other non-citizens.
- The Rice Institute (now Rice University) was dedicated at Houston.
- The Freewoman feminist weekly newspaper ceased publications in London. It was revived at The New Freewoman the following year and published for another six months.
- A total eclipse of the Sun cast a shadow across South America, and was visible in parts of Ecuador, Colombia, Peru and Brazil.
- Died: James Mackay, 80, British-born New Zealand politician, main developer of the West Coast of New Zealand (b. 1831)

== October 11, 1912 (Friday) ==
- The Prince of Wales, heir to the British throne and the future King Edward VIII, began his studies at Magdalen College as a commoner.
- Italy and Turkey broke off peace negotiations as Montenegro took Ottoman territory near Skiptchanik (Šipčanik, between Dečić and Tuzi).

== October 12, 1912 (Saturday) ==
- A fire broke out at a mine owned by North Mount Lyell on the west coast of Tasmania, killing 42 miners.
- Stock prices dropped in London, Paris, Berlin and Vienna as the First Balkan War escalated.
- The province of Hsikangseng, with a capital at Batang, was created from West Sichuan and Eastern Tibet.
- The largest grain elevator in the world opened at the Port of Montreal, more than doubling the capacity of the port. Over the next five years, the amount of grain shipped through Montreal increased more than 25 times.
- A new abbey was consecrated on the historic site of Quarr Abbey on the Isle of Wight.
- Born:
  - Edward Hidalgo, Mexican-born U.S. government official, United States Secretary of the Navy 1979-1981 and highest ranking Hispanic official in the United States Department of Defense; as Eduardo Hidalgo y Kunhardt, in Mexico City, Mexico (d. 1995)
  - Grigory Kravchenko, Soviet air force officer, commander of the 215th Fighter Aviation Division during World War II, recipient of the Hero of the Soviet Union; in Yekaterinoslav Governorate, Russian Empire (now Ukraine) (killed in action, 1943)

== October 13, 1912 (Sunday) ==
- Bulgaria, Serbia and Greece demanded the Ottoman Empire to grant autonomy to Macedonia within six months and served an ultimatum on the Turkish government in Istanbul.
- Born: Cornel Wilde, Hungarian-born American actor, known for his film roles including A Song to Remember and The Greatest Show on Earth; as Kornél Weisz in Privigye, Kingdom of Hungary, Austria-Hungary (now Prievidza, Slovakia)(d. 1989)

== October 14, 1912 (Monday) ==
- Former U.S. President Theodore Roosevelt was shot and wounded by a .38 caliber bullet fired by John Schrank, a New York City saloonkeeper, who was standing at a distance of only 30 feet. The bullet was slowed when it passed through Roosevelt's metal eyeglasses case and the folded, fifty-page manuscript of Roosevelt's prepared speech, but still penetrated three inches into his chest, too close to the heart to be safely removed by surgery. Schrank was tackled by bystanders before he could fire a second shot, and Roosevelt went on to deliver his speech before getting medical treatment. Schrank would be found insane and would spend the rest of his life at a mental hospital in Waupun, Wisconsin, where he would die on September 15, 1943.
- Montenegro's Prince Danilo led the capture of Tuzi.
- Turkish troops invaded Serbia, crossing at Ristovatz.
- General Benjamín Zeledón died, either killed by his own men or by the victorious Nicaraguan government.
- The first government under Prime Minister Titu Maiorescu was dissolved in Romania.
- The Junior Philatelic Society hosted the Jubilee International Stamp Exhibition in London.
- The municipal zoological garden for Riga, Latvia opened to the public. Today, the Riga Zoo houses over 4,000 animals of nearly 500 species.
- Born: Joseph Muzquiz, Spanish clergyman and promoter of the Opus Dei movement; as José Luis Múzquiz de Miguel, in Badajoz, Spain (d. 1983)

== October 15, 1912 (Tuesday) ==
- Italian and Turkish delegates signed a preliminary peace agreement in Switzerland at Ouchy, with the Italian fleet immediately being recalled from the Aegean Sea and Turkish troops withdrawing three days later from Libya.
- Turkey declined to reply to the note from the three Balkan states.
- The New York Giants beat the Boston Red Sox 11–4 to avoid elimination from the World Series and to set up a seventh game.

== October 16, 1912 (Wednesday) ==
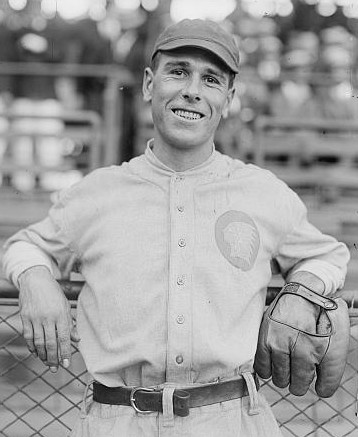
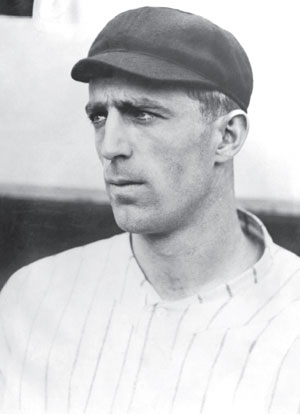
Fred Snodgrass and Fred Merkle
- A typhoon in the Philippines killed 1,000 people at Cebu.
- Montenegro captured Berane.
- Mexican rebel forces under the command of General Félix Diaz captured Veracruz, Mexico.
- Bulgarian pilot Radul Minkov and his observer, Prodan Toprakchiev, performed the first reconnaissance and second bombing from an airplane in history, throwing hand grenades from their Albatros biplane at the railway station of Karaagac near Edirne against Turkey.
- Russian explorer Georgy Brusilov and the 24 crewmen of the Svyataya Anna (St. Anna) became trapped in the Arctic ice after sailing into the Kara Sea. At the time, the ship was still close to Russia's Yamal Peninsula and the crew could have escaped to safety, but Brusilov made the decision to wait out the winter.
- The Boston Red Sox won the World Series, defeating the New York Giants, 3–2, at Boston. The series had been tied 3-3, and the deciding game was tied 1–1 after nine innings. The Giants had taken a 2–1 lead in the tenth, but then gave up two runs after the Giants' Fred Snodgrass dropped an easy fly ball, Christy Mathewson walked a batter, and Fred Merkle failed to catch a foul ball.
- Composer Arnold Schoenberg premiered his lyrical drama, Pierrot lunaire, at the Choralion-Saal in Berlin.
- Born:
  - Clifford Hansen, American politician, Governor of Wyoming 1963-1967, U.S. Senator 1967-1978; in Zenith, Wyoming, United States (d. 2009)
  - Maidie Norman, American actress, known for her film roles in The Well and What Ever Happened to Baby Jane?; as Maidie Gamble, in Villa Rica, Georgia, United States (d. 1998)

== October 17, 1912 (Thursday) ==
- Turkey declared war on Bulgaria and Serbia.
- A general election was held in Malta.
- Krupp engineers Benno Strauss and Eduard Maurer patented austenitic stainless steel.
- Philadelphia Phillies' owner Horace Fogel was expelled from the baseball's National League after having charged in an interview with the Chicago Post that several of the league's umpires, as well as St. Louis Cardinals' manager Roger Bresnahan, had conspired to help the Giants win the 1912 pennant.
- The French Cycling Federation, governing body for the Tour de France and for bicycling in France, voted to withdraw official approval for women's cycling events.
- Born: Pope John Paul I, Italian priest who reigned as the Pope of the Catholic Church for 33 days between his selection and death; as Albino Luciani, in Canale d'Agordo, Kingdom of Italy (now Italy) (d. 1978)

== October 18, 1912 (Friday) ==
- The Ottoman Empire and Italy signed the First Treaty of Lausanne at the Swiss city of Ouchy at 3:30 pm to end the Italo-Turkish War, with the Empire agreeing to grant independence to Tripolitania and Cyrenaica long enough for the North African provinces to come under Italian control. In return for the cession of Libya, as well as the Dodecanese Islands, Italy paid a sum representing 4 percent of the Ottoman national debt (in consideration of the cost of the war) and allowed the Ottoman Sultan to continue as the Caliph of Libyan Muslims. The Ottoman field commanders were ordered to withdraw their men, despite their feeling that they "were more than sure of their ability to win the war", and transferred Libyan soldiers to Istanbul for military training and an eventual recapture of the territory, a plan which would fail during World War I.
- King Ferdinand of Bulgaria issued a proclamation of holy war against the Ottoman Empire.
- The Earnslaw made her maiden voyage on Lake Wakatipu, from Kingston to Queenstown, New Zealand.
- Born: Philibert Tsiranana, Malagasy state leader, first President of Madagascar (1959-1972); in Ambarikorano, French Madagascar (now Madagascar) (d. 1978)

== October 19, 1912 (Saturday) ==
- The infantries of the Balkan League (Montenegro, Serbia, Greece and Bulgaria) crossed their borders into the western Ottoman Empire.
- The Turkish warship Torgul Reis bombarded the Bulgarian ports of Varna and Balchik on the Black Sea.
- Died: Richard Temple, English opera singer, best known for his collaborations with Gilbert and Sullivan (b. 1846)

== October 20, 1912 (Sunday) ==
- Turkey's Vardar Army engaged in its first major battles against the Balkan League invaders. The Serbian Timok Infantry overcame the Turks at Egri Palanga, and the Bulgarian Second Infantry forced a retreat of the Ottoman 16th Infantry at Kocana, Macedonia. At Bilac, the Ottoman 19th Infantry was able to resist the invading Serbian Morava Infantry.
- The United Kingdom recognized Italian sovereignty over Tripoli and Cyrenaica.
- William Kolehmainen, a brother of Olympic distance runner Hannes Kolehmainen who had abandoned his amateur status, set a world record in the marathon as a professional athlete, running the 26 mile, 385 yard distance in 2 hours, 29 minutes, and 39.2 seconds for the fastest marathon up to that time. The previous mark of 2:32:21 had been held by Hans Holmer. The official (amateur) record at the time was 2:40:32.2, held by Thure Johansson of Sweden.
- Born: Vũ Trọng Phụng, Vietnamese writer and journalist, author of Dumb Luck; in Mỹ Hào, French Indochina (now Vietnam) (d. 1939)

== October 21, 1912 (Monday) ==
- Greece took control of the island of Lemnos while Bulgaria captured Fort Chermen, and Serbia took the mountain Sultan Tepe.
- An alliance between the Liberal Party and Labour Democrats allowed them to capture 76 of 123 seats in the Storting during parliamentary elections in Norway.
- Fifteen indigenous Huilliche were killed by police in the Forrahue massacre in southern Chile.
- Born: Georg Solti, Hungarian-born British conductor, musical director of the Chicago Symphony Orchestra; as György Stern in Budapest, Austria-Hungary (now Hungary) (d. 1997)

== October 22, 1912 (Tuesday) ==
- The Serbian Third Army captured Pristina from the Ottomans, celebrating a return to the city that had been taken by the Turks in 1389.
- Peasants in the states of Santa Catarina and Paraná in Brazil began a rebellion and fought with federal troops in what became known as the Contestado War. In the first of the clashes, rebel leader José Maria de Santo Agostinho, sanctified as "São João Maria" by his followers, was killed in action in Santa Catarina at Taquaruçu.
- The Prince Alexei of Russia was reported to be seriously ill from haemophilia.
- The Australian Flying Corps established their first air base at Point Cook, Victoria, Australia, and two days later were raising recruit for their squadron.
- Born:
  - Johan Hendrik Weidner, Belgian-Dutch partisan, member of the Dutch resistance during World War II, Croix de Guerre and Legion of Honour from France and the Order of Orange-Nassau from the Netherlands; in Brussels, Belgium (d. 1994)
  - Frances Drake, American film actress known for Les Misérables; as Frances Morgan Dean, in New York City, United States (d. 2000)

== October 23, 1912 (Wednesday) ==
- As the First Balkan War continued, the Battle of Kumanovo began between the Serbian and Ottoman armies.
- A majority of the American force involved in the military intervention in Nicaragua left the country, except for a force of 100 U.S. Marines who remained in the capital of Managua. In the nearly three-month operation, 37 American servicemen had been killed in action.
- Danish Prime Minister Klaus Berntsen introduced a constitutional reform bill to provide for women's suffrage in Denmark.
- General Félix Diaz was taken prisoner as Mexican government troops retook Veracruz, Mexico.
- The Kaiser Wilhelm Institute for Chemistry (now the Max Planck Institute for Chemistry), and the Kaiser Wilhelm Institute for Physical Chemistry and Electrochemistry (now the Fritz Haber Institute), were both formally inaugurated in the Berlin suburb of Dahlem as the first two research institutions for the Kaiser Wilhelm Society for the Advancement of Science.

== October 24, 1912 (Thursday) ==
- Kirk-Kilisse fell to Bulgaria, and Kumanovo fell to Serbia in Macedonia.
- Harry Hawker, founder of Hawker Aircraft set a record of being airborne for 8 hours and 23 minutes at Brooklands, England.
- New York City Police Department lieutenant Charles Becker was found guilty of the killing of gambler Herman Rosenthal.
- Died:
  - Mykola Lysenko, 70, Ukrainian composer, known for operas Natalka Poltavka and Taras Bulba (b. 1842)
  - Arthur Peel, 83, Speaker of the House of Commons from 1884 to 1895 (b. 1829)

== October 25, 1912 (Friday) ==
- Bulgarian troops advanced on Adrianople, while the Greek Army occupied Kozani in Macedonia.
- France and Spain agreed on the division of Morocco.
- Adult educating pioneer Albert Mansbridge organized a meeting of 200 teachers and school officials in Edinburgh to form the Scottish branch of the Workers' Educational Association.
- The Richard Strauss opera Ariadne auf Naxos opened in Stuttgart.
- High school friends and aspiring writers Tristan Tzara and Ion Vinea, with artist Marcel Janco, began publishing the literary magazine Symbol to promote the Symbolist movement in Romania. Despite their ambitious goals, the magazine folded in December.
- Born:
  - Jack Kent Cooke, Canadian-born American sports executive, owner of the Washington Redskins, Los Angeles Lakers, and Los Angeles Kings; in Hamilton, Ontario, Canada (d. 1997)
  - Minnie Pearl, American comedian best known for her Ozark character in country television variety series Hee Haw; as Sarah Colley Cannon, in Centerville, Tennessee, United States (d. 1996)

== October 26, 1912 (Saturday) ==
- Greek forces took control of the city of Thessaloniki from the Ottoman Empire, restoring it to Greek control. The Ottoman Empire had previously captured the city on March 29, 1430.
- U.S. President William Howard Taft appeared at the dedication of Alliance College, founded by the Polish National Alliance in Cambridge Springs, Pennsylvania. The college would cease operations on June 30, 1987.
- General Félix Díaz was sentenced to death by court-martial.
- The Serbian army captured Skopje (called Uskub by the Ottomans) from the Ottoman Empire.
- Romanian Prime Minister Titu Maiorescu reconstituted his cabinet.
- Born: Don Siegel, American film director known for Invasion of the Body Snatchers, Dirty Harry, The Shootist, and Escape from Alcatraz; as Donald Siegal, in Chicago, United States (d. 1991)

== October 27, 1912 (Sunday) ==
- Bulgaria occupied Ishtip, Macedonia.
- Born: Conlon Nancarrow, American-born Mexican composer, known for works including Studies for Player Piano; as Samuel Conlon Nancarrow, in Texarkana, Arkansas, United States (d. 1997)

== October 28, 1912 (Monday) ==
- The Serbian Army occupied Köprülü, now known as Veles, North Macedonia.
- The Bulgarian Army occupied Drama and Babi Eski, Macedonia. The latter cut the Ottoman line of communications with Constantinople.
- The Montenegrin and Serbian Army met at Sjenica (now part of Serbia).
- Six people died when the Irish collier Tenet sank in the Bristol Channel.
- Twelve days after becoming trapped in an ice field during the disastrous Brusilov expedition, the crew of the Svyataya Anna lost their chance to escape to safety when winds sent the field drifting northward into the Arctic Ocean, with the ship locked inside. The ship would remain trapped in moving ice for a year and a half, and only two of the sailors would survive. The ship's log would finally be found in July 2010.
- Belgian suffragist Léonie de Waha co-founded the Union of Women of Wallonia.
- Born: Richard Doll, English medical researcher known for linking certain health effects to smoking; as William Richard Shaboe Doll, in Hampton, London, England (d. 2005)

== October 29, 1912 (Tuesday) ==
- Ahmed Muhtar Pasha resigned as Grand Vizier of Turkey, and was succeeded by Kâmil Pasha.
- Greek Army forces occupied Veria, Macedonia.
- The Ottoman Army under Nazım Pasha and Bulgarian Army forces began the Battle of Lule Burgas in Thrace.
- Serbia began civil authority in areas they controlled in Macedonia.

== October 30, 1912 (Wednesday) ==
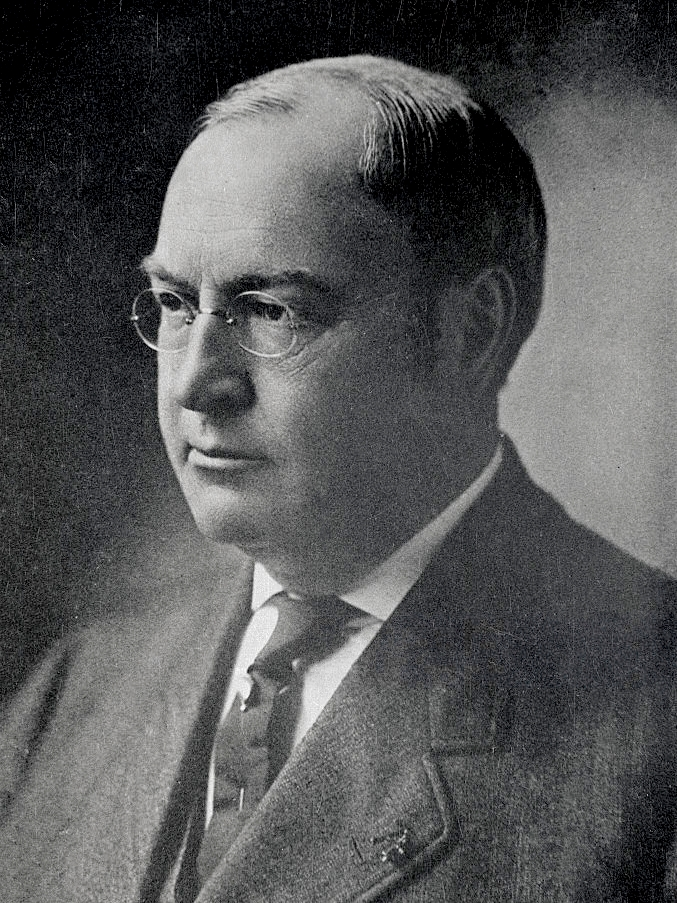
Vice President James S. Sherman

- James S. Sherman, Vice President of the United States, died in office, six days before the presidential election. Sherman, 57 years old, died at 9:42 pm at his home in Utica, New York from acute kidney failure. His physician, Dr. Fayette H. Peck, said that Sherman's decline had been caused by the strain of his acceptance speech on August 24, when the Republican National Convention had re-nominated him as President William Howard Taft's running mate.
- An insurgency erupted among ethnic Albanians in the Ottoman-controlled region of Luma when the Serbian Army tried to cross through the area to gain access to the Adriatic Sea.
- Bulgarian Army forces captured Lule Burgas in Thrace.
- Greek forces captured Beshpinar in Ottoman-held territory now part of Greece.
- The U.S. Navy battleship USS New York was launched in Brooklyn, New York City.
- Theodore Roosevelt delivered his "Farewell Manifesto" to an audience of 16,000 in Madison Square Garden, the last speech of his unsuccessful run for a third term as president.
- Born: José Ferrater Mora, Spanish philosopher, noted for promoting extending universal rights to humans and animals as both are part of the same moral sphere; in Barcelona, Spain (d. 1991)
- Died: Alejandro Gorostiaga, 72, Chilean army officer and noted commander during the War of the Pacific (b. 1840)

== October 31, 1912 (Thursday) ==
- Nazım Pasha and the Ottoman Army were driven from Thrace by the Bulgarian Army who captured Tchorlu. The Ottomans retreated to their line of defense at Chatalja.
- The Serbian Army occupied Prisend in what is now Kosovo.
- The Greek Army occupied Grevena, Western Macedonia and the islands Imbros and Thasos.
- The Montenegrin Army occupied Ipek in what is now Kosovo.
- The French government proposed that powers should proclaim disinterest, and offered to mediate between the Ottoman Empire and the Balkan League.
- Scouting founder Robert Baden-Powell married Olave St Clair Soames, who was 32 years her senior, at Parkstone in Poole, Dorset, England.
- The Musketeers of Pig Alley, directed by D. W. Griffith and starring Lillian Gish, was released, becoming attributed by critics as the first gangster film ever made. It was added to the National Film Registry in 2016.
- Born
  - Dale Evans, American singer, actress, wife and singing partner of Roy Rogers; as Frances Octavia Smith, in Uvalde, Texas, United States (d. 2001)
  - Ollie Johnston, American animator, member of Disney's Nine Old Men, known for the Walt Disney films Snow White and the Seven Dwarfs, Fantasia and Bambi; as Oliver Johnston, Jr., in Palo Alto, California, United States (d. 2008)
