= December 1912 =

Month of 1912

<<	December 1912					>>
Su	Mo	Tu	We	Th	Fr	Sa
1	2	3	4	5	6	7
8	9	10	11	12	13	14
15	16	17	18	19	20	21
22	23	24	25	26	27	28
29	30	31

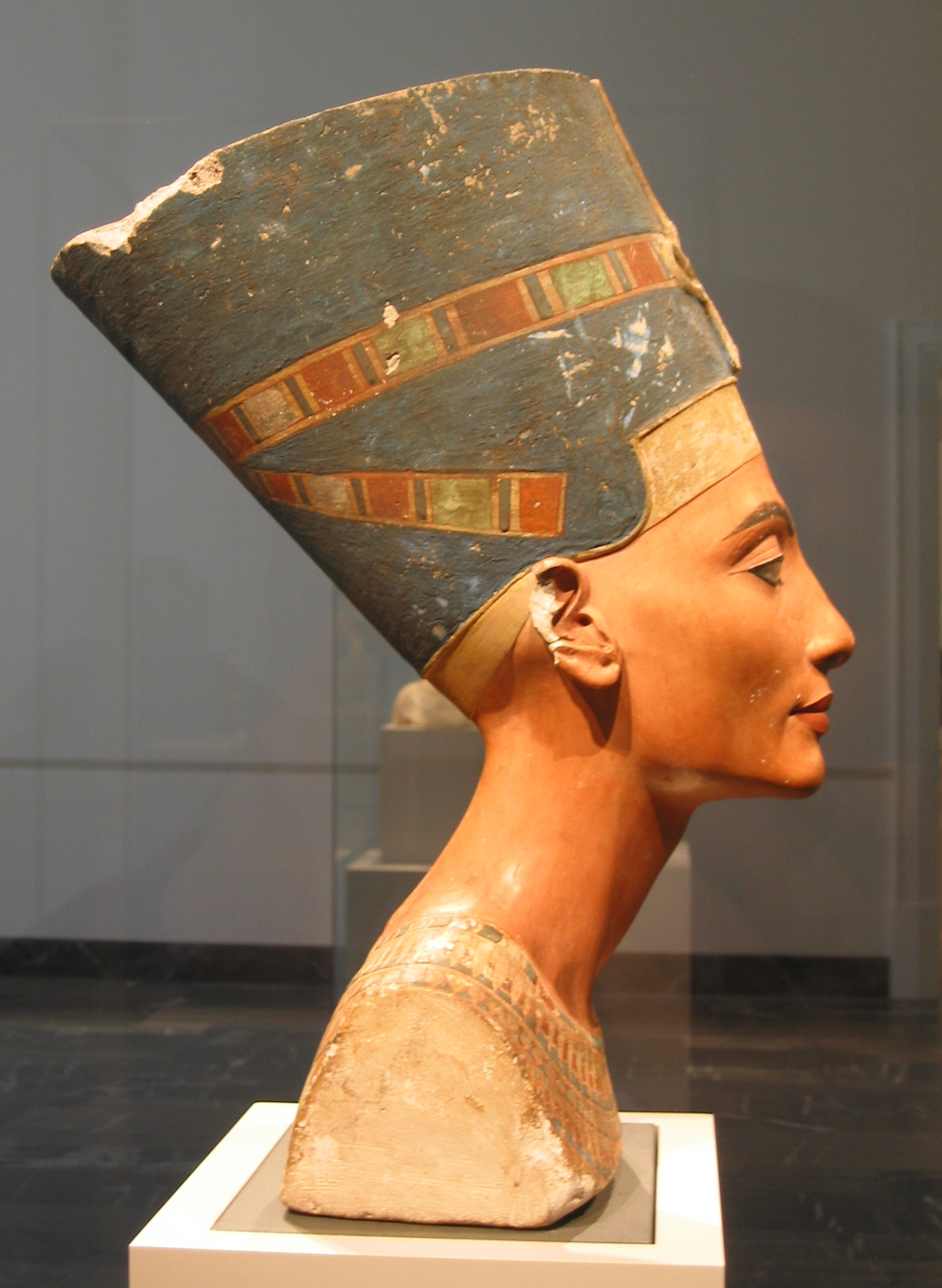
December 6, 1912: Authentic bust of Egypt's Queen Nefertiti discovered after 32 centuries

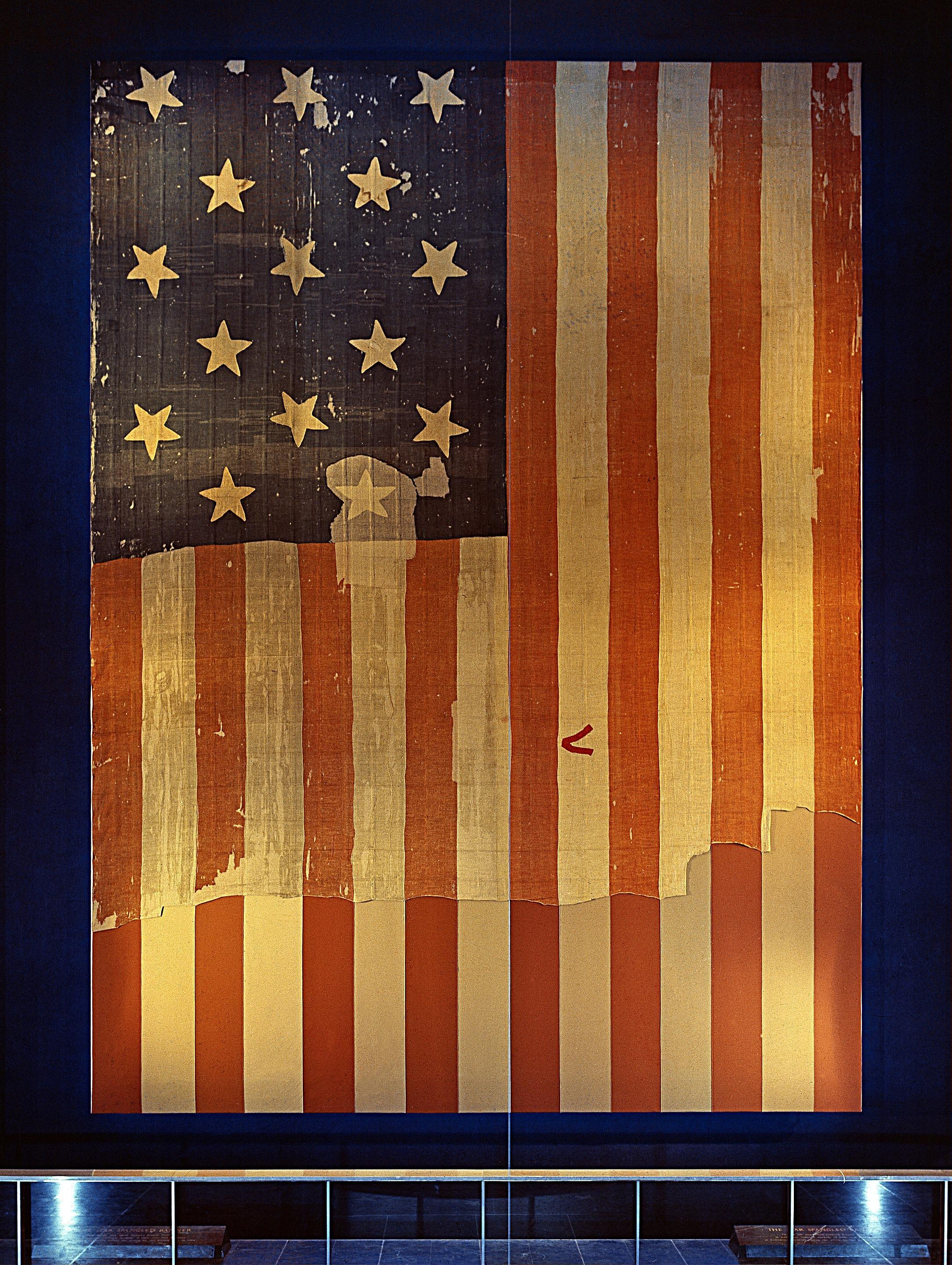
December 19, 1912: The original "Star Spangled Banner" is donated to the Smithsonian

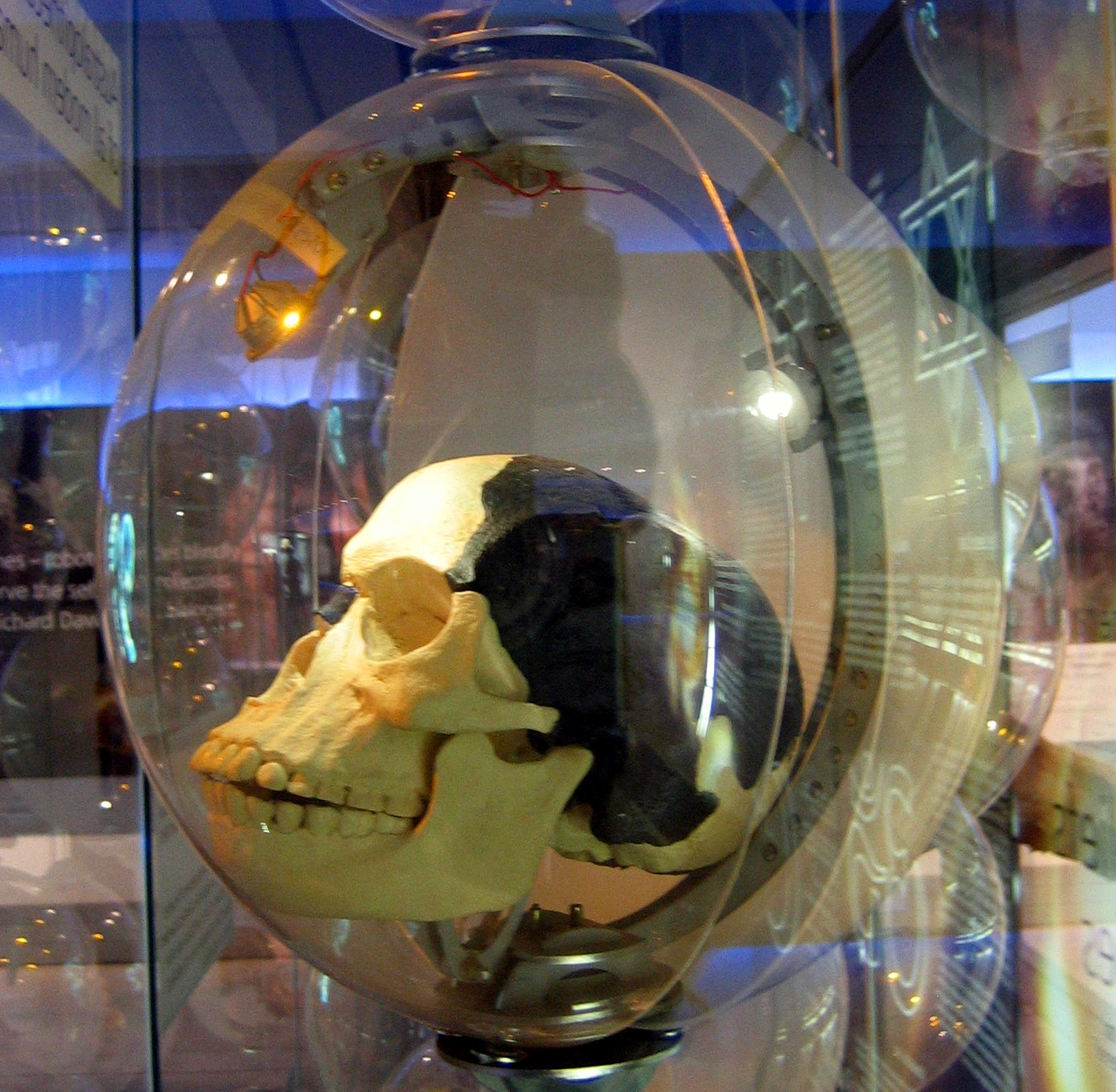
December 18, 1912: Fake prehistoric "missing link" Eoanthropus dawsoni presented to British scientists

The following events occurred in December 1912:

== December 1, 1912 (Sunday) ==
- Mohandas Gandhi began the practice of wearing traditional clothing from India, after meeting with his mentor in the Indian independence movement, Gopal Krishna Gokhale in South Africa. To that point, Gandhi had been a lawyer in Pretoria during his adult life, and had worn traditional Western clothing.
- Hiram Bingham completed his first Peruvian expedition, during which he had discovered the Inca ruins at Machu Picchu, and departed Peru with 100 cases of artifacts and 700 photographs.
- Benito Mussolini, as a member of the Italian Socialist Party, assumed the direction of the party's newspaper Avanti!.
- Born: Minoru Yamasaki, American architect, designer of the original World Trade Center; in Seattle, Washington, United States (d. 1986)

== December 2, 1912 (Monday) ==
- General Uehara Yūsaku resigned as Japan's Minister of War after the rest of the cabinet refused to agree to increasing the army by an additional two divisions. Uyehera's departure preceded the resignation of the entire ministry.
- Archbishop Adolfo Alejandro Nouel was made President of the Republic of Santo Domingo (now the Dominican Republic).
- German Chancellor Theobald von Bethmann Hollweg told the Reichstag in a speech that Germany would go to war if Austria-Hungary was attacked by any other nation as a matter of defending Germany's future and security.
- Two rail lines opened in South Africa: a line of 31 miles 3 chains (50.0 kilometres) in length between Schoombee to Hofmeyr in Eastern Cape, and a line of 2 miles 50 chains (4.2 kilometres) in length between Ottery to Diep River in Cape Town.

== December 3, 1912 (Tuesday) ==
- At Çatalca, the government of Turkey signed an armistice with Bulgaria, Serbia and Montenegro, but Greece did not participate. The ceasefire took effect at 7:00 pm local time, temporarily halting the fighting. Part of the ceasefire was to hold a peace conference in London, but the discussions failed and hostilities would resume on February 3, 1913.
- U.S. President William Howard Taft delivered his State of the Union Address to the United States Congress, focusing on expanding army and naval forces, including servicemen to man the proposed naval base at Pearl Harbor in Hawaii.
- The impeachment trial of U.S. District Judge Robert W. Archbald began in the United States Senate.
- Fifteen people were killed in a train wreck near Dresden, Ohio.
- Died: Alice Bunker Stockham, 79, American physician, fifth American woman to practice medicine (b. 1833)

== December 4, 1912 (Wednesday) ==
- The Marquis Saionji Kinmochi resigned as Prime Minister of Japan, and the other cabinet followed suit, after the ministers were unable to find a replacement for War Minister Uehara Yūsaku.
- Italy's Chamber of Deputies approved the peace treaty with Turkey 335-24.
- American boxer Jack Johnson shocked much of America by marrying "outside his race" to white American Lucille Cameron. The two would divorce in 1924.
- Cliff Sterrett's cartoon Polly and Her Pals made its debut in the New York Journal.
- Born: Gregory "Pappy" Boyington, American Marine air force officer, commander of the "Black Sheep Squadron" in World War II; in Coeur d'Alene, Idaho, United States (d. 1988)
- Died: Archibald Gracie, 53, American writer and Titanic survivor, author of The Truth about the Titanic, died from health damage sustained while awaiting rescue in a lifeboat (b. 1858)

== December 5, 1912 (Thursday) ==
- The Triple Alliance agreement was renewed in Vienna between Germany, Austria-Hungary and Italy.
- Persian religious leader ʻAbdu'l-Bahá completed the trip to the United States and Canada that had started with his arrival in New York City on April 11. Having introduced the Baháʼí Faith to North America, he departed from New York City on the steamer Celtic, bound for Liverpool.
- The United States Department of Justice dropped further antitrust proceedings against the American Sugar Refining Company.
- Former seaplane racer Jacques Schneider announced at a banquet for the Monaco Hydroplane Meet that he would award a trophy for the fastest speed of an amphibious airplane that could cover a distance of at least 150 nautical miles (280 km; 170 mi). The inaugural race was held four months later on April 16, 1913.
- Born:
  - Keisuke Kinoshita, Japanese film director, known for films including Twenty-Four Eyes and Immortal Love, recipient of the Order of the Rising Sun; in Hamamatsu, Shizuoka Prefecture, Japanese Empire (now Japan) (d. 1998)
  - Kate Simon, Polish-born American writer, known for her autobiographical writings such as Etchings in an Hourglass and travel writing including Renaissance Tapestry; as Kaila Grobsmith, in Warsaw, Congress Kingdom of Poland (now Poland) (d. 1990)
  - Sonny Boy Williamson, American blues musician, known for blues hits including "Don't Start Me Talkin'", "Checkin' Up on My Baby", and "Bring It On Home"; as Aleck or Alex Ford, later known as Alex Miller, in Tutwiler, Mississippi, United States (d. 1965)
- Died: James Scott Mason, 39, British Governor of the North Borneo protectorate, was killed after falling from a horse (b. 1853)

== December 6, 1912 (Friday) ==
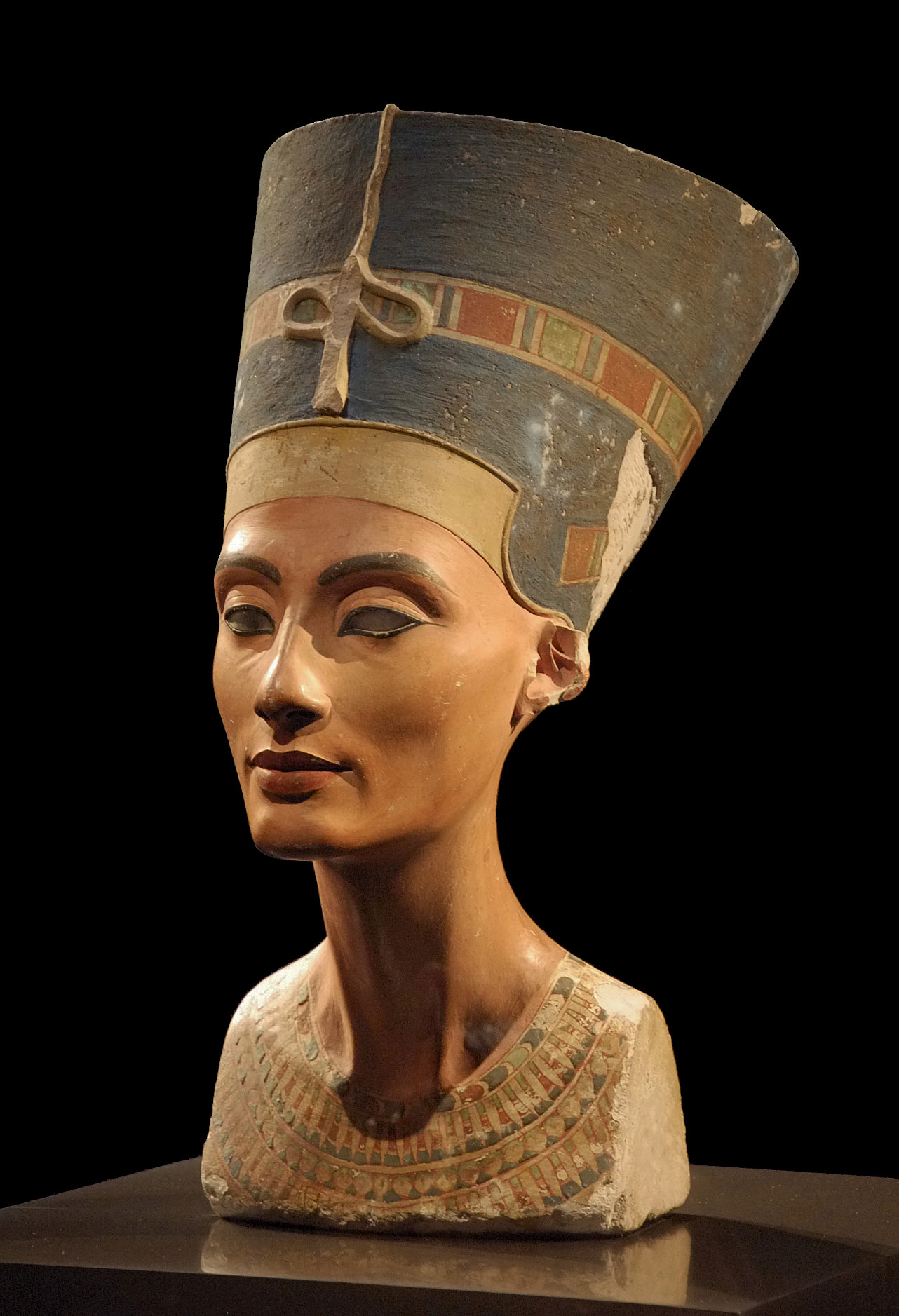
The Nefertiti Bust found in Tell al-Amarna, Egypt

- In excavations at Tell al-Amarna in Egypt, the Nefertiti Bust was unearthed, intact, after being buried for around 3,200 years. The team, led by a team led by German archaeologist Ludwig Borchardt, discovered the limestone statue of the head and shoulders of the wife of the Pharaoh Akhenaten (who reigned 1353 BC to 1336 BC), while sifting through the workshop of the sculptor Thutmose. Borchardt concluded that the statue had once set upon a wooden shelf, next to a similar bust of Akhenaten, until termite damage caused both objects to topple; and while the pharaoh's statue was shattered, Nefertiti's bust survived because it had happened to land, upside down, on its flat top.
- Count Terauchi Masatake, the Governor-General of Korea, was asked by the Emperor to form a new government as Prime Minister of Japan.
- Vladimir, the Metropolitan of Moscow, was appointed President of the Russian Orthodox Synod and Metropolitan of Saint Petersburg as well.

== December 7, 1912 (Saturday) ==
- German-American banker Paul Warburg presented the blueprint, for what would become the Federal Reserve, to U.S. Congress and to U.S. President-elect Woodrow Wilson. The original plan, with twenty reserve banks under control of a central board, would be altered to 12 federal reserve banks after Warburg modified the Federal Reserve Act to accommodate the wishes of Congressman Carter Glass.
- Hassan Riaz Pasha, the Turkish Governor of Scutari, refused to accept his nation's armistice and continued fighting the First Balkan War.
- Born: Lewis S. Feuer, American philosopher, noted for his switch from Marxism to neoconservatism, author of Karl Marx and Friedrich Engels: Basic Writings on Politics and Philosophy; in New York City, United States (d. 2002)
- Died: George Darwin, 67, English astronomer and mathematician, recipient of the Royal Medal and Gold Medal of the Royal Astronomical Society, son of Charles Darwin (b. 1845)

== December 8, 1912 (Sunday) ==
- Kaiser Wilhelm of Germany convened a "War Council" at Potsdam, with his military leaders (General Helmuth von Moltke, Admiral Alfred von Tirpitz, and Admiral Georg Alexander von Müller) after receiving the news that the United Kingdom would join with France and Russia in the event of a European war. The outcome was to postpone plans for war with the Russian Empire until the near future, but to prepare the German public for an inevitable "racial war, the war of Slavdom against Germandom" in 1914 or 1915. According to Major General Karl von Wenninger, who was present at the meeting, "Moltke wanted to launch an immediate attack" on France and the United Kingdom because it was the most favorable opportunity for winning, while Tirpitz persuaded a reluctant Kaiser that an attack should wait a year until construction of the U-boat pens at Heligoland and the widening of the Kiel Canal could be completed.
- Turkish cavalry and artillery withdrew from Tripoli, which had been ceded to Italy.
- The upper level of the Our Lady of Mount Carmel's Church opened in The Bronx, New York City.
- Born: Jean Garrigue, American poet, noted contributor of Five Young American Poets; as Gertrude Louise Garrigus, in Evansville, Indiana, United States (d. 1972)

== December 9, 1912 (Monday) ==
- The Greek submarine Delfin made the first torpedo attack in modern warfare, after sighting the Turkish cruiser Medjidieh and five escort ships. Lt. Commander Paparrigopoulos ordered the firing of the underwater missile from a distance of 500 meters, but the torpedo "did not run properly and sank."
- General Moritz von Auffenberg resigned as the War Minister of Austria, and was succeeded the next day by Franz Conrad von Hötzendorf.
- Prince Louis of Battenberg, who would later anglicize his name to Louis Mountbatten, was appointed as the new British First Sea Lord.
- Governor General of Canada Prince Arthur opened the new building for the Montreal Museum of Fine Arts.
- Born:
  - Tip O'Neill, American politician, Speaker of the U.S. House of Representatives from 1977 to 1987; as Thomas Phillip O'Neill, in Cambridge, Massachusetts, United States (d. 1994)
  - George Balabushka, Russian-born American designer, known for his high-end cue stick design for billiards; in the Russian Empire (now Russia) (d. 1975)
  - Denis Glover, New Zealand poet and publisher, co-founder of Caxton Press; in Dunedin, New Zealand (d. 1980)

== December 10, 1912 (Tuesday) ==
- Austria-Hungary issued a general mobilization to all of its military men and reservists all over the world in anticipation of war.
- The Turkish infantry departed Tripoli, completing its surrender of the Libyan territory to Italy.
- Born:
  - Philip Hart, American politician, U.S. Senator from Michigan from 1959 to 1976; in Bryn Mawr, Pennsylvania, United States (d. 1976)
  - Tetsuji Takechi, Japanese theatrical and film director, noted for his modern interpretations of traditional Japanese theatre and adaptations for television and erotic films Women... Oh, Women! and Daydream; in Osaka, Japanese Empire (now Japan) (d. 1988)

== December 11, 1912 (Wednesday) ==
- Roland Garros of France set a new altitude record of 18,670 feet at Tunis.
- Born: Carlo Ponti, Italian film producer, known for films including La Strada, Doctor Zhivago, and Blowup, husband to Sophia Loren; in Magenta, Lombardy, Kingdom of Italy (now Italy) (d. 2007)

== December 12, 1912 (Thursday) ==
- U.S. Representative Charles Calvin Bowman of Pennsylvania was unseated by a 153-118 vote of his fellow House Congressmen, who concluded that he had used corrupt practices to be elected in 1910. Bowman still had almost three months left in his term, which would expire March 4. Bowman's Democratic opponent, George R. McLean, was also denied a seat by a 181-88 margin, because the majority concluded that he was guilty of the same practices as Bowman.
- Eduard Müller was elected President of the Swiss Confederation.
- Off of the coast of Port Arthur, Texas, a sudden storm in the Gulf of Mexico killed all 10 of the crew of Standard Oil's Barge Number 87, and two British freighters, the Impoco and Hainaut, with another 36 people on board.
- The Apostolic Vicariate of Kivu was established by the White Fathers Catholic mission around Lake Kivu in what is now present-day Burundi and Rwanda. It eventually became the Roman Catholic Archdiocese of Gitega in 1959.
- Born: Henry Armstrong, American boxer, 19-time World Welterweight champion; as Henry Jackson Jr., in Columbus, Mississippi, United States (d. 1988)
- Died:
  - Susan Tolman Mills, 87, American academic, co-founder of Mills College, the first women's college west of the U.S. Rocky Mountains (b. 1826)
  - Luitpold, Prince Regent of Bavaria, 91, de facto ruler of Bavaria from 1886 to 1912, regent for his nephews, King Ludwig II and King Otto (b. 1821). Luitpold's son, Prince Ludwig of the House of Wittelsbach, succeeded to the regency and would later become King Ludwig III.

== December 13, 1912 (Friday) ==
- By executive order, outgoing U.S. President William Howard Taft established National Petroleum Reserve No. 2 (NPR-2), at the Buena Vista Hills in Kern County, California, south of Reserve No. 1.
- Antitrust proceedings were filed in the United States against the "candy trust."
- Born: Luiz Gonzaga, Brazilian musician, promoter of baião music; as Luiz Gonzaga do Nascimento, in Exu, Pernambuco, Brazil (d. 1989)
- Died: Yūjirō Motora, 54, Japanese psychologist, noted for his research in experimental psychology with G. Stanley Hall at Johns Hopkins University, died of an infection from erysipelas. (b. 1858)

== December 14, 1912 (Saturday) ==
- General Louis Botha resigned as Prime Minister of South Africa.
- The United States Senate voted to approve the construction of a $2,000,000 memorial to Abraham Lincoln at West Potomac Park in Washington, D.C.
- Lieutenant Belgrave Edward Sutton Ninnis died in Antarctica, after falling into a crevasse whilst on an expedition with explorer Douglas Mawson. Ninnis had been guiding six dogs who were pulling the sledge carrying much of the party's supplies, including most of their food, their tent, and spare clothing, when the ice gave way. Looking into the pit, Mawson and Dr. Xavier Mertz saw a dog about 150 feet below, and an even deeper abyss beyond, but nothing else. Mawson and Mertz were left with a ten-day supply of food and still had 315 miles to cover at the time of the accident.
- South Africa beat Wales 3-0 in a rugby union test match in Cardiff during their European tour.
- Born: Alfred Lennon, English sailor and musician, father to John Lennon; in Liverpool, England (d. 1976)

== December 15, 1912 (Sunday) ==
- Whitelaw Reid, the United States Ambassador to the United Kingdom, died suddenly "after an illness which began hardly more than a fortnight ago and the serious nature of which had become apparent hardly more than a few hours before his death." Reid was mourned in both nations, as the United Kingdom's King George and U.S. President William Howard Taft issued statements.
- American aviator Tony Jannus set a record for the longest hydro-aeroplane flight landing in New Orleans at 8:30 pm after he and his passenger had taken off from Omaha, Nebraska, on a journey of 1,500 miles (2,400 km). Jannus fared better than other aviators that day, as the wreckage of Horace Kearny's hydro-aeroplane flyer was found in the Pacific Ocean, 30 hours after he and his newspaper reporter passenger had gone missing during an attempt to fly from Los Angeles to San Francisco.
- Newspaper readers across the United States were hoaxed by an Associated Press story with the dateline "Keokuk, Ia., Dec. 14," which began as follows:

"A human hand protruding from tons of cement, the frames of which were removed several days ago, was found today in one of the concrete pillars of the government dam across the Mississippi, and explains the disappearance several weeks ago of one of the laborers. The man's body is imbedded (sic) in the solid concrete and is likely to stay there, as to blast it out would destroy not only the body but a great part of one of the largest blocks of cement composing the dam."

The "news" was a surprise to the residents of Keokuk, Iowa; the paper there would write two days later that the AP "sent out a weird story of horror said to have occurred on the great dam here," and commented "The press association put a Keokuk date line on the thing deliberately and with full knowledge that it did not emanate from Keokuk, Ia." after picking up the fake news from a St. Louis newspaper and changing the details.

- The German silent film drama Das Mirakel was released by Continental-Kunstfilm in New York City. The film has been the subject of many copyright litigations as it adapted the 1911 play The Miracle without the permission of playwright Karl Vollmöller.
- Born: Ray Eames, American designer, co-creator with her husband Charles Eames of the Eames House and the Mathematica: A World of Numbers... and Beyond exhibit at the California Museum of Science and Technology; as Bernice Alexandra Kaiser, in Sacramento, California, United States (d. 1988)
- Died: Thomas Charles Scanlen, 78, South African politician, third Prime Minister of Britain's Cape Colony in South Africa, from 1881 to 1884 (b. 1834)

== December 16, 1912 (Monday) ==
- The Balkan Peace Conference was opened at St. James's Palace in London by Secretary of Foreign Affairs Edward Grey. On the same day, the navies of Greece and Turkey fought a battle at the entrance of the Bosporus strait. The Turkish fleet, with 4 battleships, 9 destroyers and 6 torpedo boats opened fire on a Greek battleship squadron which arrived from the island of Imbros. The Greek fleet retaliated ten minutes later, sending the Turkish ships in retreat, and the battle ended at 10:30 am, forty minutes after it began. The Greeks sustained 8 casualties and no major damage, while the Turks lost 58 killed and wounded.
- Shinano Railway extended the Ōito Line in the Nagano Prefecture, Japan, with station Itoigawa serving the line.
- A narrow gauge rail line of 24 miles 48 chains (39.6 kilometres) in length opened between Bergrivier to Vredenburg, Western Cape, South Africa.

== December 17, 1912 (Tuesday) ==
- The Franco-Spanish treaty of Morocco was approved by the Spanish Chamber of Deputies, 216-22.
- Kamoun, the self-described Sultan of Dar-al-Kuti in what is now the Central African Republic, was defeated by the French Army after nearly two years of defying France and its control of Ouanda Djallé.
- Born: Edward Short, British politician, Deputy Leader of the Labour Party 1972 to 1976, Secretary of State for Education and Science for the Harold Wilson administration 1968-1970; in Warcop, Cumbria, England (d. 2012)
- Died: "Common", 24, English racehorse who won the English Triple Crown in 1891 (b. 1888)

== December 18, 1912 (Wednesday) ==
- A mine explosion at Achenbach, near Dortmund, Germany, killed 25 people and injured 15.
- The United States House of Representatives passed the Burnett immigration bill, barring any immigrants who were over 16 and illiterate, 178-52. Although the bill would pass the United States Senate as well, U.S. President William Howard Taft would veto it and the House would fail to override it.
- Piltdown Man, thought to be the fossilized skull of a hitherto unknown form of early human, was presented to the Geological Society of London. Dr. A.S. Woodard told a reporter, "That this skull, representing a hitherto unknown species, is the missing link, I have no doubt." In 1953, the Piltdown Man would be revealed to be a hoax.
- Roland Garros became the first person to fly an airplane across the Mediterranean Sea, traveling 160 miles from Tunis to Sicily.
- The India National Missionary Conference convened in Calcutta, where it established a committee to propose literature reflecting Christian principles that could be shared and accepted in India.
- Born: Benjamin O. Davis Jr., American air force officer, first African-American to become (in 1998) a four-star general in the United States Air Force; in Washington, D.C. (d. 2002). His father, then First Lt. Benjamin O. Davis Sr., would become (in 1940) the first African-American general in the United States Army.
- Died:
  - Will Carleton, 67, American poet known for poetry collections including A Thousand Thoughts with Index of Subjects (b. 1845)
  - J. Cheever Goodwin, 60, American playwright, known for his musical comedies including Evangeline, The Merry Monarch, and Panjandrum (b. 1850)

== December 19, 1912 (Thursday) ==
- The United States warned rebel leaders in the Republic of Santo Domingo (now the Dominican Republic) not to take action against the new government, or it would intervene.
- U.S. President William Howard Taft, in his final three months in office, asked Congress to give seats, though not votes, to members of the presidential cabinet. Congress then adjourned without taking up the idea, and Taft departed for a visit to Panama.
- Japanese Army Captains Yoshitoshi Tokugawa and Kumazo Hino became the first military pilots in Japan, with Hino flying a German Grade monoplane for 1,200 meters and Tokugawa flying for four minutes in a French Farman biplane.
- William H. Van Schaick, who had been the captain of the steamboat General Slocum when a fire on the ship killed over 1,000 passengers in 1904, was paroled from New York's Sing Sing prison after serving three and one half years. He would be pardoned on Christmas Day by U.S. President William Howard Taft.
- The Federal University of Paraná was established in Curitiba, Brazil.
- The flag that inspired the American national anthem, flown over Fort McHenry in 1814 during the Battle of Baltimore, was donated to the Smithsonian Institution. Francis Scott Key had written about the flag of 15 stars and 15 stripes in his poem "Defence of Fort M'Henry," and the melody of "To Anacreon in Heaven" was adapted to turn the poem into "The Star-Spangled Banner." The descendants of the commander of Fort McHenry, Major George Armistead, had loaned the flag to the Institution in 1907, before making a gift of it.
- Died: Thomas Brennan, 59, Irish activist, co-founder of the Irish National Land League (b. 1853)

== December 20, 1912 (Friday) ==
- Greek forces captured Korytsa in the Ottoman-held territory of what is now present-day Albania.
- Twenty-two of the 27 people on the British steamer Florence were killed off the coast of Cape Race, Newfoundland.
- General Louis Botha returned as Prime Minister of South Africa and formed a new cabinet.
- J. H. Logue, a Chicago diamond merchant, was brutally murdered in his office in midday. Logue was gagged, stabbed 17 times, shot in his right shoulder, had his skull crushed, had part of his right thumb severed, and had his mouth burned with acid. The killing was believed to have been revenge for Logue's prosecution of diamond thieves in 1905 and 1906. Five men and four women were arrested the next day in connection with the killing.
- A rail line 10 miles 31 chains (16.7 kilometres) in length opened between Melk to Motkop, Western Cape, South Africa.

== December 21, 1912 (Saturday) ==
- Norway, Sweden and Denmark jointly proclaimed their neutrality, refusing to favor either side in a European war.
- Prince Katsura Tarō was appointed as the new Prime Minister of Japan.
- Moroccan rebels attacked French Army forces at Dar-el-Kadi, near Mogador, Morocco.
- U.S. President William Howard Taft departed the United States on board the new battleship USS Arkansas for a visit to the Panama Canal.
- The first full-color film, The Miracle, premiered at the Royal Opera House in London. Produced by Joseph Menchen and directed by Michel-Antoine Carré, each film panel was hand-painted to achieve the full-color effect. The film became a major hit and was showcased around Europe in 1913.

== December 22, 1912 (Sunday) ==
- A group of 80 actors and actresses in New York City's theaters gathered to form a labor union, the American Federation of Actors, which in 1913 would incorporate as the Actors' Equity Association.
- Born: Lady Bird Johnson, First Lady of the United States from 1963 to 1969; as Claudia Alta Taylor, in Karnack, Texas, United States (d. 2007)

== December 23, 1912 (Monday) ==
- The Viceroy of India, Lord Hardinge, was wounded in an assassination attempt, when a bomb was thrown at him as he was arriving in Delhi. Hardinge's attendant was killed in the explosion. Hardinge was being brought to the capital on an elephant as part of the arrival ceremony, when a bomb was thrown at him from a housetop. Debris struck his right shoulder. Hardinge's attendant, Jamadar Mahabir Singh was killed, and 20 people were injured. Four people –Amir Ali, Avadh Behari, Bal Mukund, and Basanta Kumar Biswas (who threw the bomb)– were later executed for the attack, but the mastermind behind the plot, Rash Behari Bose, escaped to Japan where he would live the rest of his life, dying in 1945.
- The completion of heightening of the Aswan Dam was celebrated in a ceremony attended by Lord Kitchener and the Khedive of Egypt.
- Twenty-two people were killed when two British steamers collided in the Gulf of Mexico.
- Ohannes Bey Kouyoumjian, an Armenian Catholic, was appointed as the Turkish Governor of Lebanon.
- Born: Anna J. Harrison, American chemist, first woman to serve as President of the American Chemical Society; in Benton City, Missouri, United States (d. 1998)
- Died:
  - Édouard Detaille, 64, French artist, known for military paintings including The Defense of Champigny (b. 1848)
  - Otto Schoetensack, 62, German anthropologist, oversaw the discovery of homo heidelbergensis (b. 1850)
  - Lotten von Kræmer, 86, Swedish writer and activist, founder of the literary society of Samfundet De Nio and co-founder of the National Association for Women's Suffrage (b. 1828)

== December 24, 1912 (Tuesday) ==
- An assassination attempt was made against Prince Yamagata Aritomo, the former Prime Minister of Japan.
- Merck filed patent applications in Germany for synthesis of the entactogenic drug MDMA (Ecstasy), developed by Anton Köllisch.
- Lithuanian sculptor William Zorach married American painter Marguerite Thompson in New York City. The couple also became major collaborators in promoting modernist art in the United States, starting with Armory Show the following year.
- Sunnyvale, California, was incorporated as a town in Santa Clara County. The future Silicon Valley home of technology companies, including Yahoo!, originally had 1,200 people, and would have over 140,000 a century later.
- Born: Natalino Otto, Italian singer credited for developing swing music; as Natale Codognotto, in Cogoleto, Kingdom of Italy (now Italy) (d. 1969)
- Died: Lottie Moon, 72, American missionary who led the Southern Baptist mission to China (b. 1840)

== December 25, 1912 (Wednesday) ==
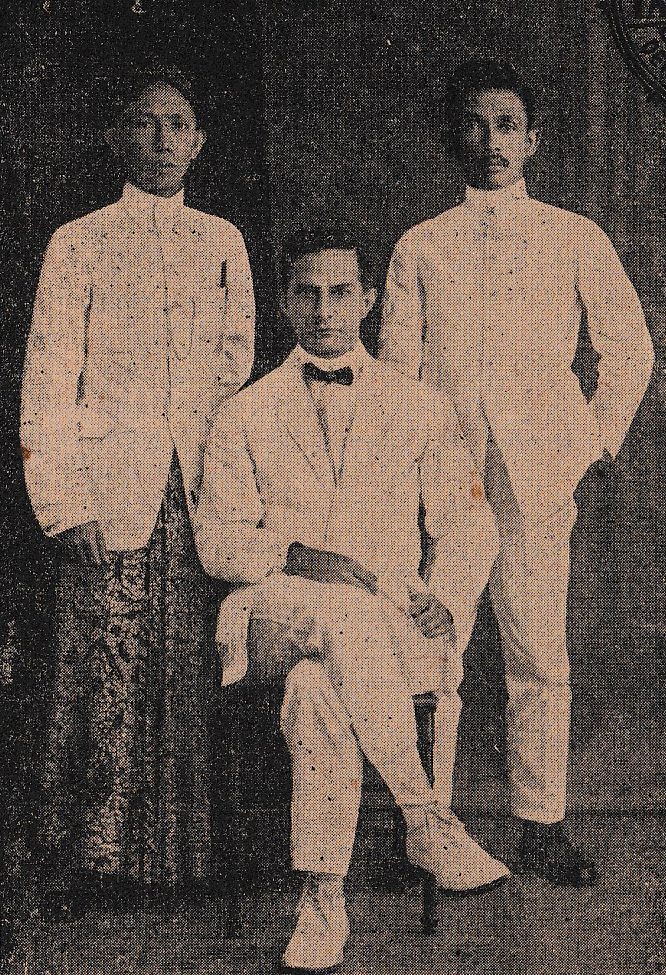
Ki Hadjar Dewantoro, Ernest Douwes Dekker, and Dr. Cipto Mangunkusumo

- The Turkoman Revolt began.
- Fifteen minutes after U.S. President William Howard Taft was driven down a street during his visit to Panama, a dynamite blast wrecked the street in Colón. No group claimed responsibility, but one report noted that "it is generally believed that the act was committed with a view to taking the life of the president and that the plot only failed because of some miscalculation in the arrangements."
- The first pro-independence organization in the Dutch East Indies (now Indonesia), the Indische Partij, was founded by Ernest Douwes Dekker, an "Indo" whose father was Dutch and mother was German-Javanese, Indonesian physician Cipto Mangunkusumo, and Indonesian writer Ki Hajar Dewantara.
- After a vote of censure by the Peruvian Senate, Elías Malpartida resigned as Prime Minister of Peru.
- Margaret Hatch, 40, a nationally known vaudeville actress, suffered a heart attack on stage while performing at a theater in Stamford, Connecticut, and died minutes later.

== December 26, 1912 (Thursday) ==
- Mexican revolutionary leader Pancho Villa was able to escape from the military prison of Santiago Tlatelolco, with the help of a sympathetic employee, and fled to the United States, where he hid in El Paso, Texas.
- The Danish steamer Volmer encountered a gale in the English Channel, where waves killed 13 of the 15 crew after they escaped in lifeboats. The ship's captain and a sailor were the only survivors.
- Raymond Poincaré declared his intention to run for President of France.
- U.S. Senator-elect William Howard Thompson of Kansas suffered severe burns while playing Santa for a group of children in Garden City, Kansas.
- The New Theatre opened in Manchester, later renamed Opera House in 1920.
- The St. James Theatre opened in Wellington.
- Born: Arsenio Lacson, Filipino politician, Mayor of Manila 1952 to 1962; in Talisay, Negros Occidental, Philippine Islands (now the Philippines) (d. 1962)

== December 27, 1912 (Friday) ==
- George Washington Donaghey, outgoing Governor of Arkansas, "accomplished through executive action what forty years of protests and duplicitous legislation had failed to do" toward ending the practice of convict leasing in his state. Although Donaghey had not been able to persuade the state legislature to ban the system of the state prisons selling the use of inmates to private companies as unpaid workers, he had lobbied for the early parole of prisoners who had committed minor offenses, and in a single day, pardoned 360 other convicts of their crimes, freeing them prison and from slave labor. The legislature ended the practice the next year.
- Former French Prime Minister Alexandre Ribot began his run for office as President of France.
- Born: Conroy Maddox, British painter, member of the Birmingham Surrealists; in Ledbury, Herefordshire, England (d. 2005)

== December 28, 1912 (Saturday) ==
- Rudolf Steiner founded the Anthroposophical Society in Cologne, breaking away from the Theosophical Society.
- Japanese Government Railways extended the Echigo Line in the Niigata Prefecture, Japan, with stations Myōhōji and Jizodo serving the line.

== December 29, 1912 (Sunday) ==
- Alexander Alexandrovich Makarov resigned as Russia's Minister of the Internal Affairs.
- Vedanayagam Samuel Azariah was ordained at St. Paul's Cathedral in Calcutta at the first Anglican bishop in India.
- A fire destroyed the oldest house in Rhode Island.
- Born: Peggy Glanville-Hicks, Australian composer; in Melbourne, Australia (d. 1990)
- Died: Philip H. Cooper, 68, American naval officer, Rear Admiral of the United States Navy and former Commander of the Asiatic Fleet (b. 1844)

== December 30, 1912 (Monday) ==
- The First Balkan War ended temporarily as the Balkan League nations —Bulgaria, Greece, Montenegro, and Serbia — signed an armistice with Turkey.
- Future U.S. presidential candidate Adlai Stevenson, 12 years old at the time, accidentally shot and killed a family friend, 16-year-old Ruth Merwin, during a party at his home in Bloomington, Illinois.
- German Foreign Minister Alfred von Kiderlen-Waechter, 50, died suddenly while visiting his sister during the Christmas holiday in Stuttgart.
- The town of Carnation, Washington (now a suburb of Seattle) was incorporated as the town of Tolt, Washington (for Tolthue, the Snoqualmie Indian name for the area). It would change its name to Carnation in honor with of the Carnation Evaporated Milk Company in 1917, then back to Tolt in 1928 but, because the train depot and the post office did not change their names, the town would become Carnation again in 1951.
- Born: Pasha Angelina, Russian machinist, credited as one of the first educated skilled workers in the Soviet Union, three-time recipient of the Order of Lenin; as Praskovya Angelina, in Yekaterinoslav, Russian Empire (now Starobesheve, Ukraine) (d. 1959)

== December 31, 1912 (Tuesday) ==
- China defaulted on its payment under the Boxer Indemnity Agreement, arising from damages to the eight powers during the Boxer Rebellion.
- Álvaro de Figueroa became the new Prime Minister of Spain.
- Former Venezuelan President Cipriano Castro was detained at Ellis Island pending a ruling as to whether he was an undesirable alien.
- The Royal Navy had 16 aircraft in service – eight biplane landplanes, five monoplane landplanes, and three "hydro-aeroplanes."
- The first luxury hotel to bear the name Ritz-Carlton in North America opened with a New Year's Eve gala in Montreal.
- The final edition of the German language newspaper Deutsche Zeitung was published in Valdivia, Chile.
