= Ernest Riebe =

German-American cartoonist

Cover of Ernest Riebe's ironically-titled pro-revolutionary pamphlet, Crimes of the Bolsheviki [1919], ostensibly published by the "All-American Publishing Co." The cover design is intended to simulate an anti-Communist tract.

Ernest Riebe was a German-American cartoonist and a member of the Industrial Workers of the World (IWW), who was known for the slapstick humor he used in his comic strips. He is best remembered for his comics series Mr. Block.

== Biography ==
=== Early years ===
He immigrated to the United States in the early 20th century from Germany, and not much is known about his early and later life. However, it is known that he worked for the Spokane Industrial Worker in 1912, and until 1922, IWW publications issued his work. For at least a decade, Riebe helped the IWW, and it is assumed he lived in Minneapolis and possibly later in Chicago.

=== Career ===
Ernest Riebe worked as a cartoonist for The Industrial Worker, a weekly newspaper published by the Industrial Workers of the World (IWW). His most famous work was Mr. Block. On November 7, 1912, Mr. Block first appeared in the Industrial Worker, a newspaper owned by the IWW, and the comic strip was also published in Solidarity for three years.

According to historian Franklin Rosemont, IWW cartoonists like Riebe did not profit from their comics. Twenty-four of the strips were compiled into America’s first radical comic book in 1913, and it was advertised by the IWW press. In 2023 Between the Lines Books and PM Press published a new anthology entitled Mr Block: The Subversive Comics and Writings of Ernest Riebe. Riebe’s comic strips were anti-racist, and during the early 1920s, he and other similar cartoonists were criticized by the Ku Klux Klan, American Legion, and white-supremacist preachers and politicians.

Cartoon from Riebe's 1919 pamphlet, Crimes of the Bolsheviki.

Through the comic strip, Riebe assailed the AFL, the Socialist Party, and bourgeois values. He portrayed Mr. Block as a man "devoid of class-consciousness" who blindly believes that America is the land of opportunity, hard work pays off, and the boss looks out for the employee. However, in each strip, Riebe has Mr. Block faced with setback after setback. He gets laid off from his job because the company has been overproducing goods, gets abused by the police, is sent to jail, among other things. Often, Riebe depicts the employers as manipulators of the workers. For instance, in one comic strip, the employer speaks individually with the mixed race employees and makes them work hard by pitting the workers against each other.

=== Other works ===
Another piece of work was the Crimes of the Bolsheviki: Dedicated to the Interests of the International Proletariat. Riebe wrote and illustrated the forty-seven page booklet, which was published in 1919. Half of the book consists of original illustrations and captions by Riebe, and the other half contains a reproduction of the Constitution of the Soviet Union. The booklet was written in a tongue-in-cheek manner to show the merits of Bolshevism. It also ridiculed the values of the bourgeois and showed that the complaints of the middle class were unwarranted because the Bolsheviks were trying to end World War I and trying to get fair treatment across classes, specifically the working class.

Riebe wrote another booklet, which was titled Mr. Block and the Profiteers, also published in 1919. Like the Crimes of the Bolsheviki, this booklet was an illustrated story, which focused on Mr. Block and further advanced IWW beliefs. Riebe also wrote a poem and play about Mr. Block for the IWW press.

== Gallery ==
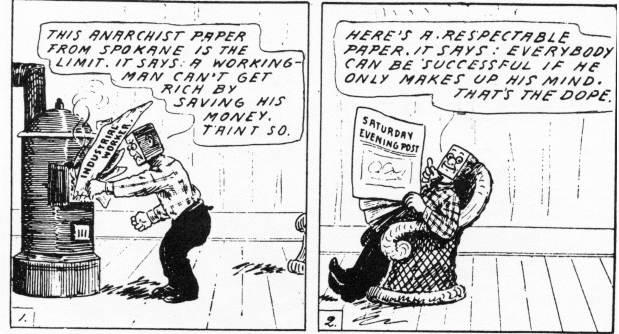
IWW cartoon character Mr. Block burns his Industrial Worker to read Saturday Evening Post, instead. Ernest Riebe, 1913.

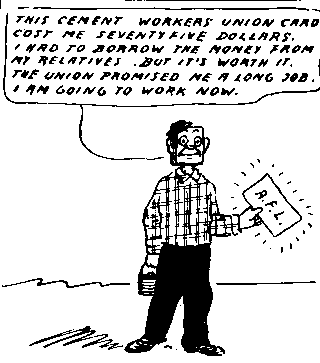
IWW cartoon character Mr. Block, gets an AFL union card

== Works ==
- Mr. Block: Twenty-Four IWW Cartoons. [1913] Chicago: Charles H. Kerr Publishing Company, 1984.
- Crimes of the Bolsheviki: Dedicated to the Interests of the International Proletariat. Chicago: All-American Publishing Co., 1919.
