= Valdivia's Deutsche Zeitung =

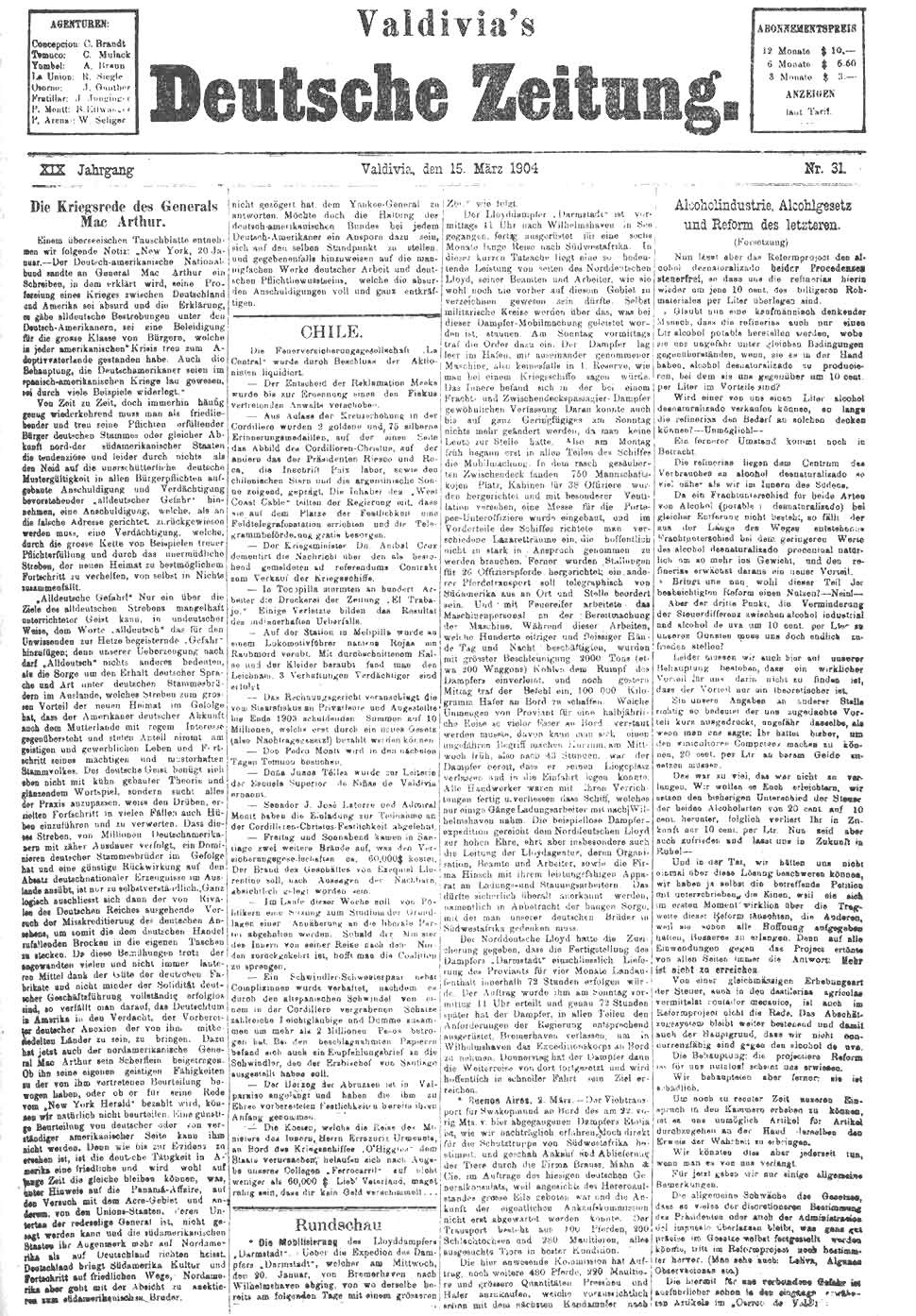
Front page of the March 15, 1904 issue of Valdivia's Deutsche Zeitung.

Valdivia's Deutsche Zeitung was a Chilean newspaper in German language, of provincial character, edited and printed in the city of Valdivia by German immigrants in Chile.

It began circulating on April 10, 1886 under the name Deutsche Zeitung für Süd-Chile by initiative of Johann Frey and Paul Springmüller, and circulated until December 31, 1887, adopting the name of Valdivia's Deutsche Zeitung to resume publication on 3 March 1888 by F. Peters and the aforementioned Springmüller.

In 1907 it absorbed the newspaper Der Grenzbote, published in Temuco and founded in 1902 by Johann Frey, which continued to be published until 31 December 1910. The Valdivia's Deutsche Zeitung published its last issue on December 31, 1912.
