= Mr. Block =

American comic strip character

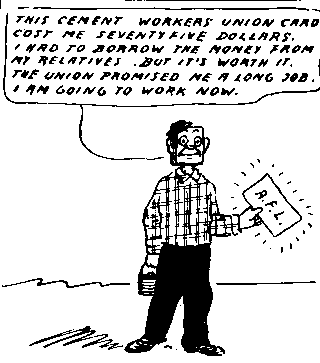
Mr. Block joins the AFL

Mr. Block is an American comics character, created by Ernest Riebe in 1912 and commemorated in a song written by Joe Hill. He is the protagonist of an eponymous satirical comics series which appeared in left-wing publications to sympathize with the common worker. Decades later Mr. Block gained historical importance for being a predecessor to underground comix.

== Comic strip ==
Mr. Block, who has no first name, was created on November 7, 1912, by Ernest Riebe, a member of the Industrial Workers of the World (IWW). Block appeared that day in the Spokane newspaper Industrial Worker, smoking a cigar and wearing a checkered suit with a top hat. Subsequently, Mr. Block lost the fancy clothes but often kept a hat, ten sizes too small, perched on one corner of his wooden blockhead.

"Mr. Block is legion," wrote Walker C. Smith in 1913. "He is representative of that host of slaves who think in terms of their masters. Mr. Block owns nothing, yet he speaks from the standpoint of the millionaire; he is patriotic without patrimony; he is a law-abiding outlaw... [who] licks the hand that smites him and kisses the boot that kicks him... the personification of all that a worker should not be."

== Eponymous song ==
Joe Hill wrote "Mr. Block" to the tune of "It Looks to Me Like a Big Time Tonight". The song, like the comic strip, is bitterly satirical about the AFL and the Socialist Party of America. Sometimes also called "Please Give Me Your Attention", it has remained a popular number through multiple editions of the Little Red Songbook.

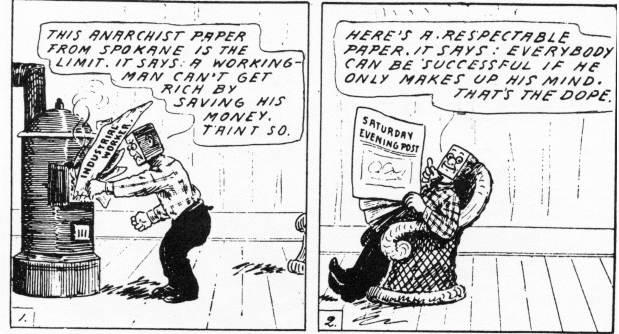
Mr. Block gets news only from the bosses' paper

Please give me your attention
I'll introduce to you
A man that is a credit to
"Our Red, White and Blue";
His head is made of lumber,
and solid as a rock;
he is a common worker
and his name is Mr. Block.
And Block he thinks he may
Be President some day.

Chorus:
Oh, Mr. Block,
you were born by mistake,
You take the cake.
You make me ache.
Tie a rock to your block
and jump in the lake.
Kindly do that for Liberty's sake.
