= Jubilee International Stamp Exhibition 1912 =

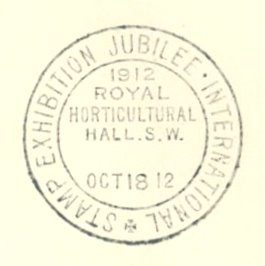
The commemorative cachet in use at the exhibition.

Jubilee International Stamp Exhibition was held 14–19 October 1912 at the Royal Horticultural Hall, London. The principal organisers were Fred Melville, H.R.F. Johnson and H.H. Harland of the Junior Philatelic Society.

An "Ideal Stamp" was produced as a souvenir.
