= Yōzō Kaneko =

Pilot in the Imperial Japanese Navy

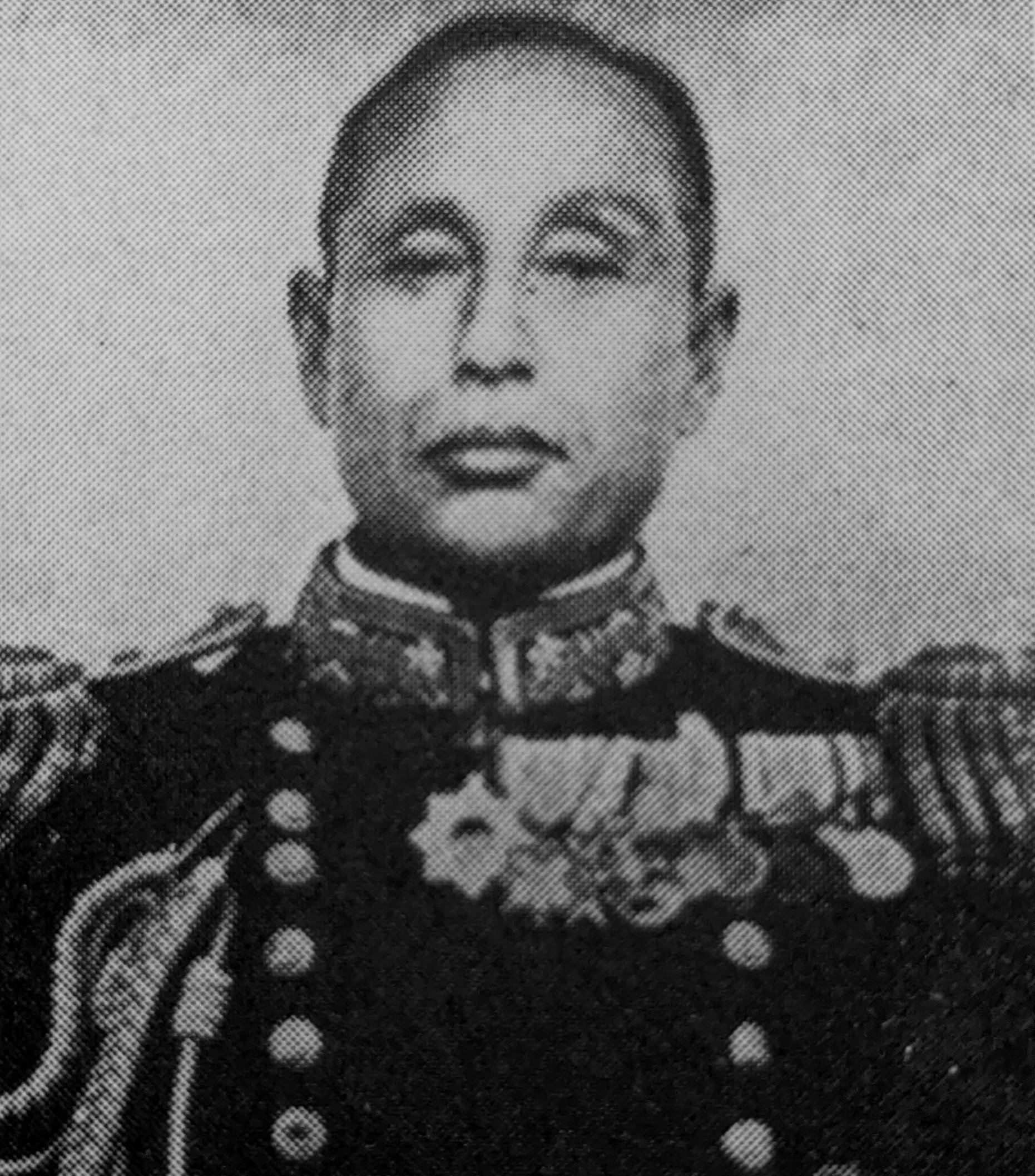
- Native name: 金子 養三
- Born: June 11, 1882; Hiroshima Prefecture, Japan
- Died: December 27, 1941 (aged 59)
- Allegiance: Empire of Japan
- Branch: Imperial Japanese Navy
- Rank: Rear admiral
- Commands: Imperial Japanese Navy Air Service
- Known for: Founder of the Imperial Japanese Navy Air Service
- Conflicts: Russo-Japanese War; Battle of Tsushima; World War I; Siege of Tsingtao
- Education: Imperial Japanese Naval Academy

Yōzō Kaneko (金子 養三, Kaneko Yōzō; 11 June 1882 – 27 December 1941) was a pilot in the Imperial Japanese Navy and the founder of the Imperial Japanese Navy Air Service. Born in Hiroshima Prefecture, he studied at Shudo Junior and Senior High School and the Imperial Japanese Naval Academy. As a naval officer he participated in the Battle of Tsushima during the Russo-Japanese War. In 1911, Kaneko was sent to France and trained as a pilot. In 1912, at Yokosuka Naval Air Technical Arsenal, Kaneko made the first flight in Japanese naval history, piloting a Farman seaplane for 15 minutes. In 1914, Kaneko and two other naval officers flew a mission in the Siege of Tsingtao during World War I, which was the first air attack in Japanese naval history. He was appointed the first commander and trainer of the Imperial Japanese Navy Air Service in 1916 and contributed to the development of the Service. Kaneko was promoted to major general in 1926.
