= April 1913 =

Month of 1913

<<	April 1913					>>
Su	Mo	Tu	We	Th	Fr	Sa
		1	2	3	4	5
6	7	8	9	10	11	12
13	14	15	16	17	18	19
20	21	22	23	24	25	26
27	28	29	30

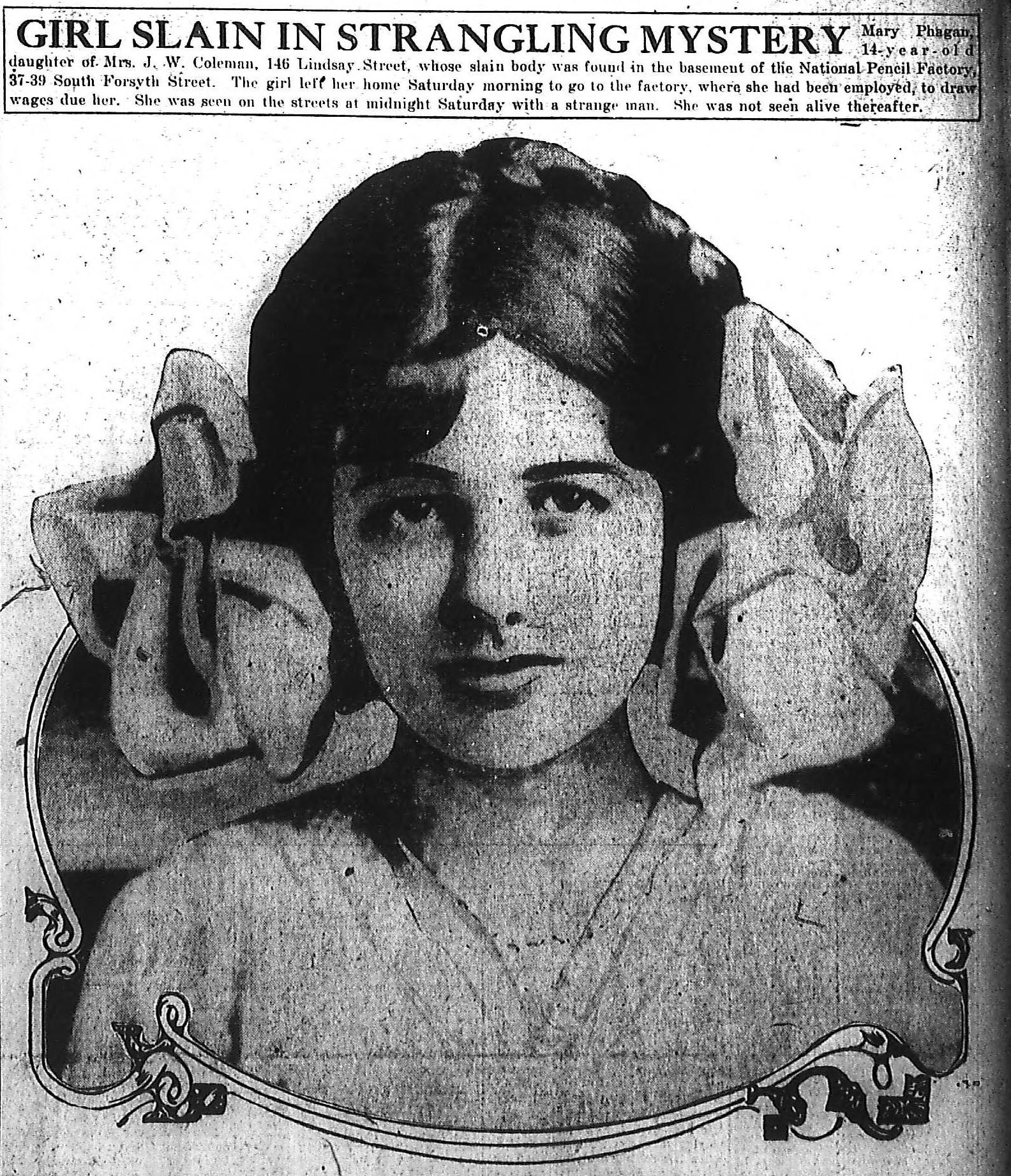
April 25, 1913: Mary Phagan, 13-year old pencil factory employee, murdered in Atlanta

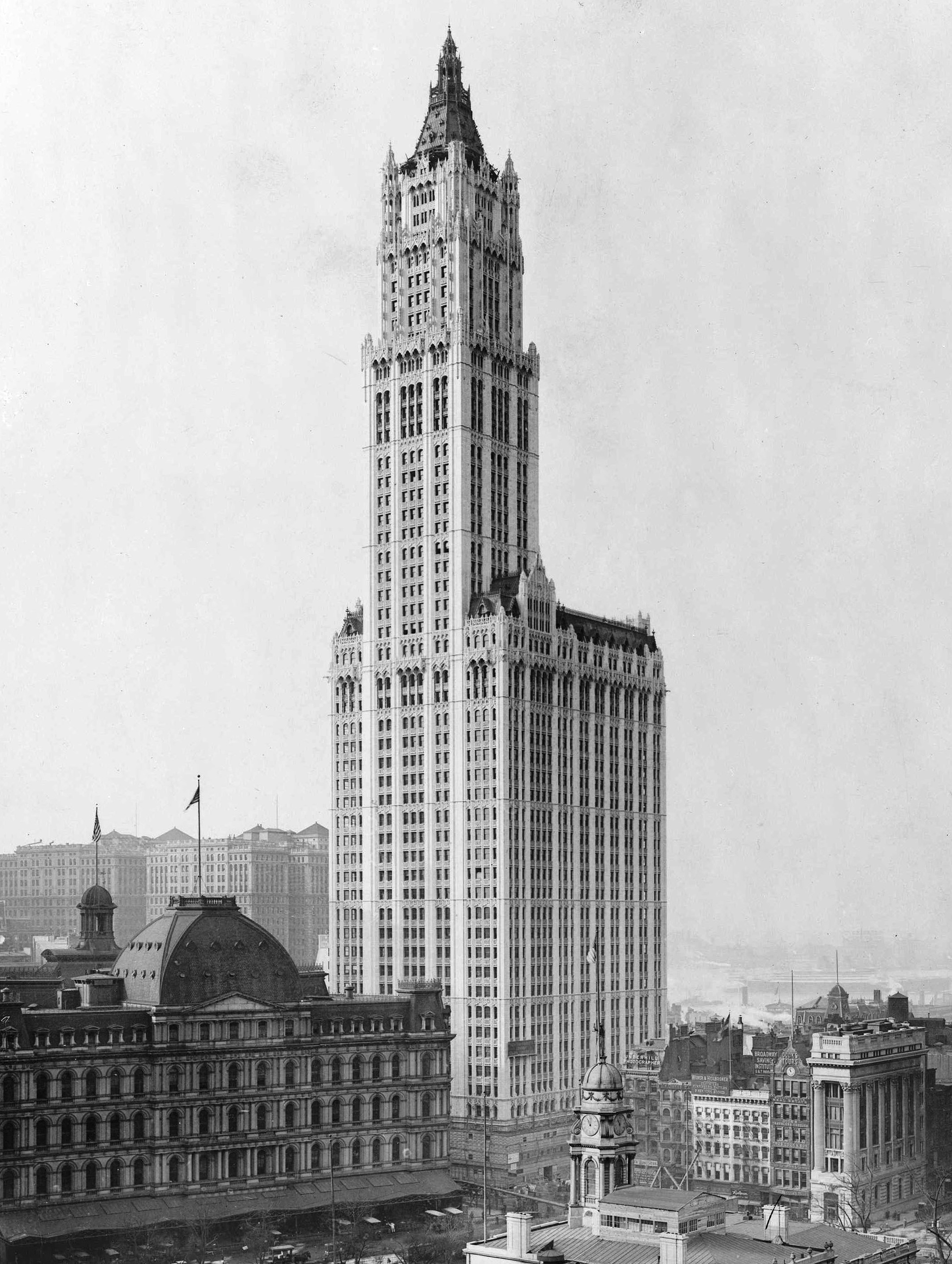
April 24, 1913: The Woolworth Building, tallest in the world until 1930, opens to the public

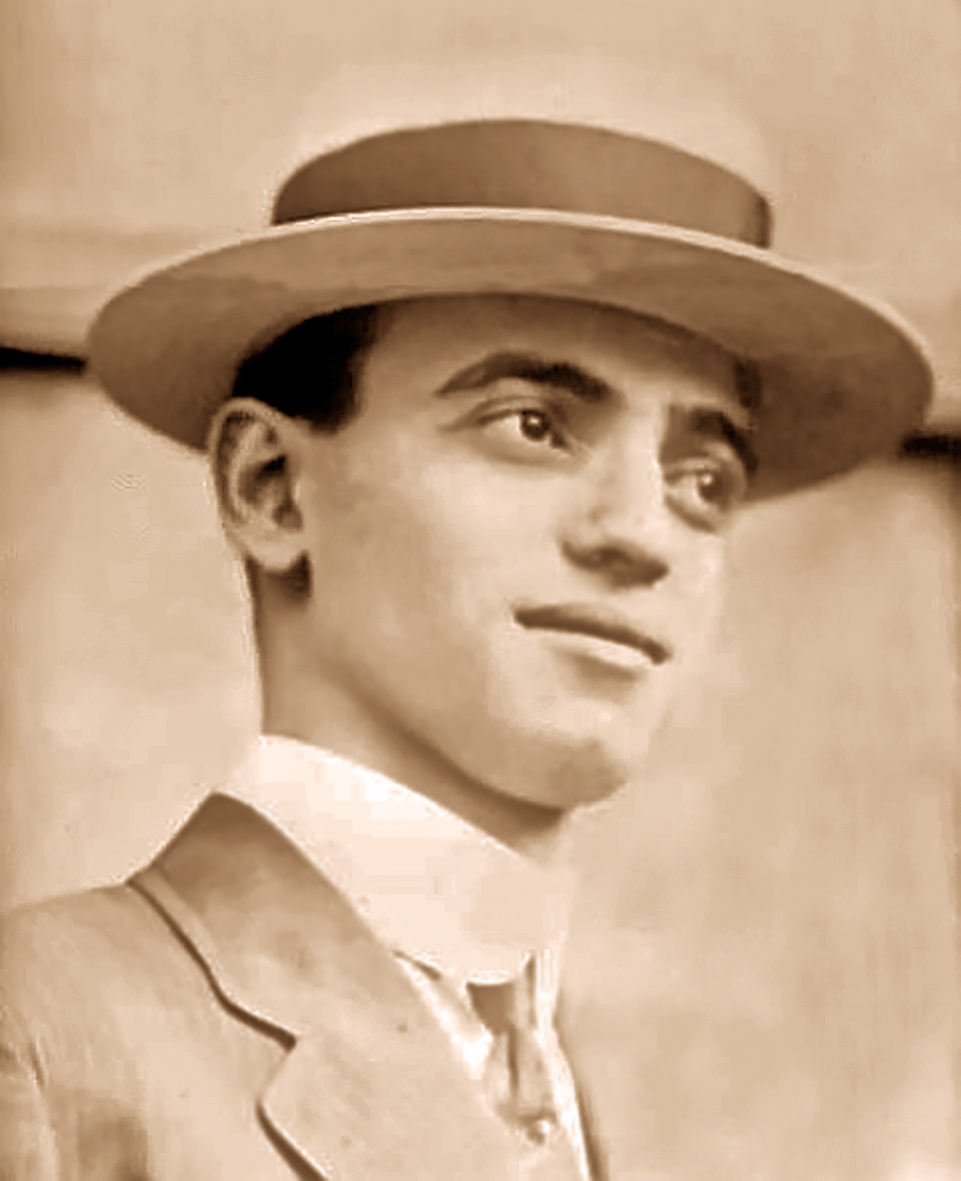
April 29, 1913: Jewish factory superintendent Leo Frank arrested and wrongfully charged with Phagan's murder.

The following events occurred in April 1913:

== April 1, 1913 (Tuesday) ==
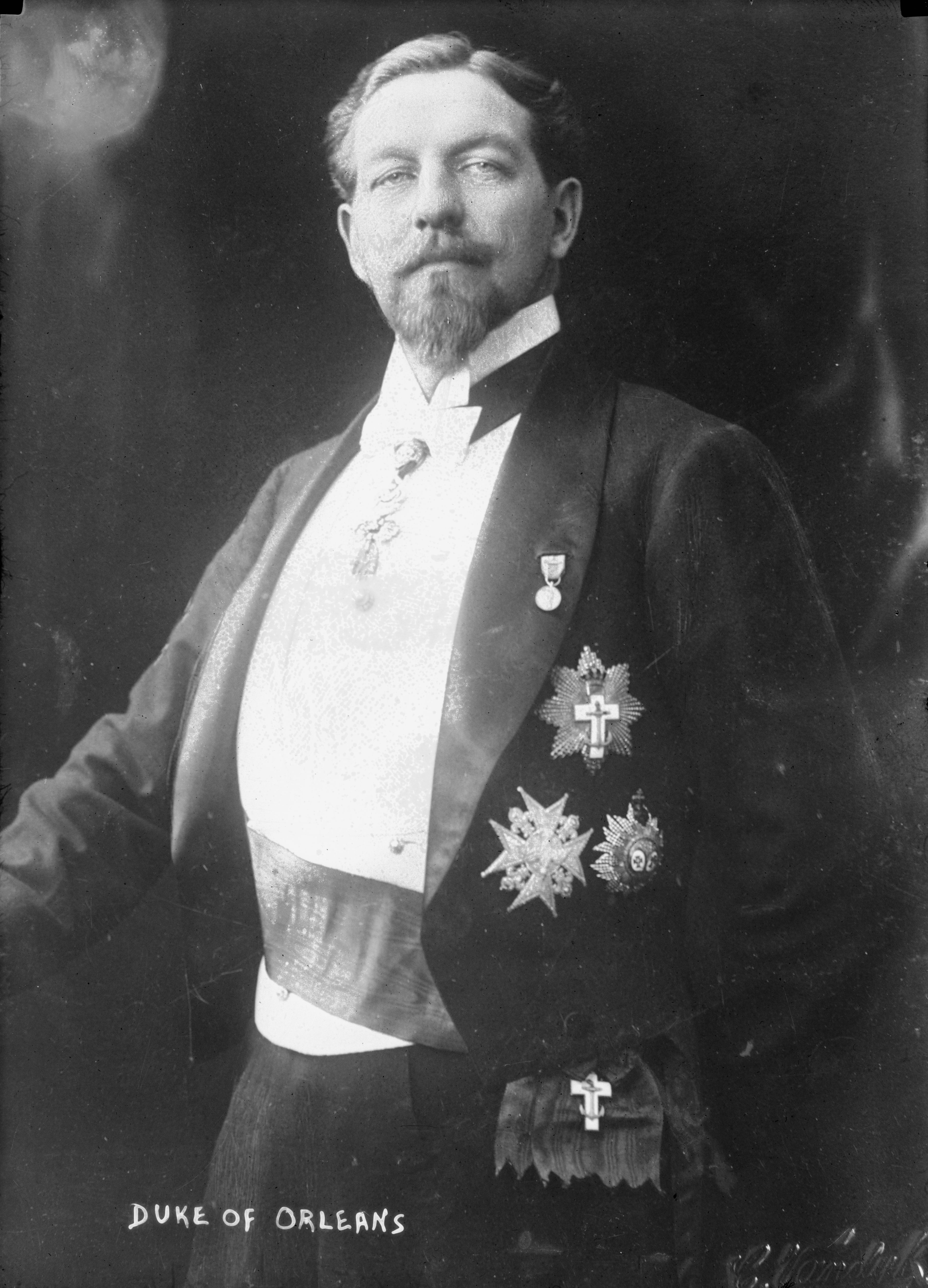
King of Albania and would-be King of France Philippe

- The Turkish government approved the terms of peace to end the First Balkan War, losing 60,000 square miles of its territory to the Balkan nations.
- The first trial of the assembly line method of manufacturing was made, with the Ford Motor Company testing the process in the putting together of a magneto for a flywheel motor at its factory in Highland Park, Michigan. The assembly process was split among 29 employees, each putting together a part of the magneto and then sending it over to another employee. The production time for each magneto was lowered from 20 minutes to 13 minutes. When the height of the line was raised the next year, and a moving conveyor was added, the time dropped to eight minutes, and then five minutes, a quadrupling of the production rate.
- Philippe, the Duke of Montpensier and pretender to the French throne, was proclaimed as the King of Albania by the provisional government.
- Romania issued its first law regulating the military aeronautics, forming the Serviciul de Aeronautică Militară.
- Lord Northcliffe, the publisher of the British newspaper, the Daily Mail, offered a prize of £10,000 ($50,000) to the first persons who could make a direct flight across the Atlantic Ocean, within 72 hours or less. In 2013 money, the equivalent would be £730,000 or $1.1 million. The shortest trip was 1,900 miles between Ireland and Newfoundland, which John Alcock and Arthur Whitten Brown would accomplish on June 15, 1919.
- Former U.S. President William Howard Taft began serving as a professor of law at Yale University.
- The Riverview Hospital opened in Coquitlam, British Columbia as a mental health facility, and was handling just over 900 patients by the end of the year. It would operate until 2012 and close to make way for new provincial mental health facility.
- The weekly newspaper Northern Herald began publication in Cairns, Australia. It would cease publication in 1939.

== April 2, 1913 (Wednesday) ==
- The Kingdom of Montenegro rejected demands from the five major European nations (Austria-Hungary, United Kingdom, France, Germany, Italy, Russia) to withdraw its troops from Albania.
- The U.S. government released a group of Apache Indians held as prisoners of war at the Fort Sill Military Reservation in Oklahoma since 1894. Of the group, 163 elected to be relocated to New Mexico, while another 76 received allotments of land in Oklahoma, and the last Apaches would leave Fort Sill on March 7, 1914.
- British record label Polydor Records was established initially as a subsidiary to the Deutsche Grammophon company, becoming its own independent label in 1972.

== April 3, 1913 (Thursday) ==
Z-4's accidental arrival at Lunéville

- The 550 foot (170 m) long German dirigible Z-4, flying near the boundary with France in order to inspect French border defenses, strayed into French territory, ran out of fuel, and went down at the airfield at Lunéville in northeastern France where the French Army seized control of the ship and detained its crew of eleven. France allowed civilian repairmen to cross over from Germany, and the Z-4 left the next day, but not before it was photographed and measured in detail.
- Emmeline Pankhurst, leader of the British suffrage movement, was sentenced to three years in prison after being convicted of the conspiracy to bomb the country home of David Lloyd George, the Chancellor of the Exchequer. She went on a hunger strike and was released nine days later.
- The ocean liner SS Vaterland, the largest ever built by Germany, was launched for the Hamburg America Line. The ship would be captured on April 6, 1917, by the United States while in the harbor at Hoboken, New Jersey, on the day of the American declaration of war against Germany in World War I, and would be renamed the SS Leviathan.
- Real County, Texas, named for Julius Real, was established from southeast Edwards County, southwest Kerr County, and western Bandera County.
- Born: Per Borten, Prime Minister of Norway 1965 to 1971; in Flå Municipality (now Melhus Municipality, Trøndelag) (d. 2005)

== April 4, 1913 (Friday) ==
- An angry mob in Mondak, Montana, carried out the lynching of a black construction worker, J. C. Collins, hours after Collins had shot and killed Sheridan County Sheriff Thomas Courtney and a deputized citizen, Richard Bermeister. Collins was forcibly removed from jail by a group who had overpowered his captors, then taken to a telephone pole and hanged; in some accounts, some of the citizens attempted unsuccessfully to set fire to the hanging corpse and, failing in that effort, shot the body with bullets. Booker T. Washington would mention the lynching in a July 15, 1913, letter to the Boston Transcript.
- The Maori Agricultural College (M.A.C.) was established in Hastings, New Zealand by Mormon missionaries exclusively for Maori students regardless of their religious affiliation. The college would be destroyed in the Napier Earthquake in 1931, the same year that the New Zealand government would take over the role of sponsorship of education.
- Born:
  - Muddy Waters (stage name for McKinley Morganfield, American blues musician credited as the "father of modern Chicago blues"; in Issaquena County, Mississippi (d. 1983)
  - Jerome Weidman, American playwright, known for his musicals such as Fiorello! and I Can Get It for You Wholesale; in New York City (d. 1998)
  - Frances Langford, American singer, best known for her hits "I'm in the Mood for Love" and "Chattanooga Choo Choo"; as Julia Frances Newbern-Langford, in Lakeland, Florida (d. 2005)
  - Gene Ramey, American jazz musician, bass player for the Jay McShann Orchestra; in Austin, Texas (d. 1984)
  - Dave Brown, Australian rugby player, centre for the Warrington Wolves and Eastern Suburbs from 1937 to 1941, and the Australia national rugby league team from 1933 to 1936; as David Brown, in Sydney (d. 1974)
- Died:
  - Edward Dowden, 70, Irish literary critic and poet, best known his criticism on William Shakespeare and poetry collection, Letters (b. 1843)
  - Emmanouil Argyropoulos, 23, the first Greek citizen to become a pilot, died ub the first fatal plane crash in Greece (b. c. 1889). Argyropoulos and his passenger, Konstantinos Manos, had been flying over the Langadas region near Thessaloniki when his Blériot airplane suddenly lost power at an altitude of 600 metres (2,000 ft) and plummeted earthward, killing both men.

== April 5, 1913 (Saturday) ==
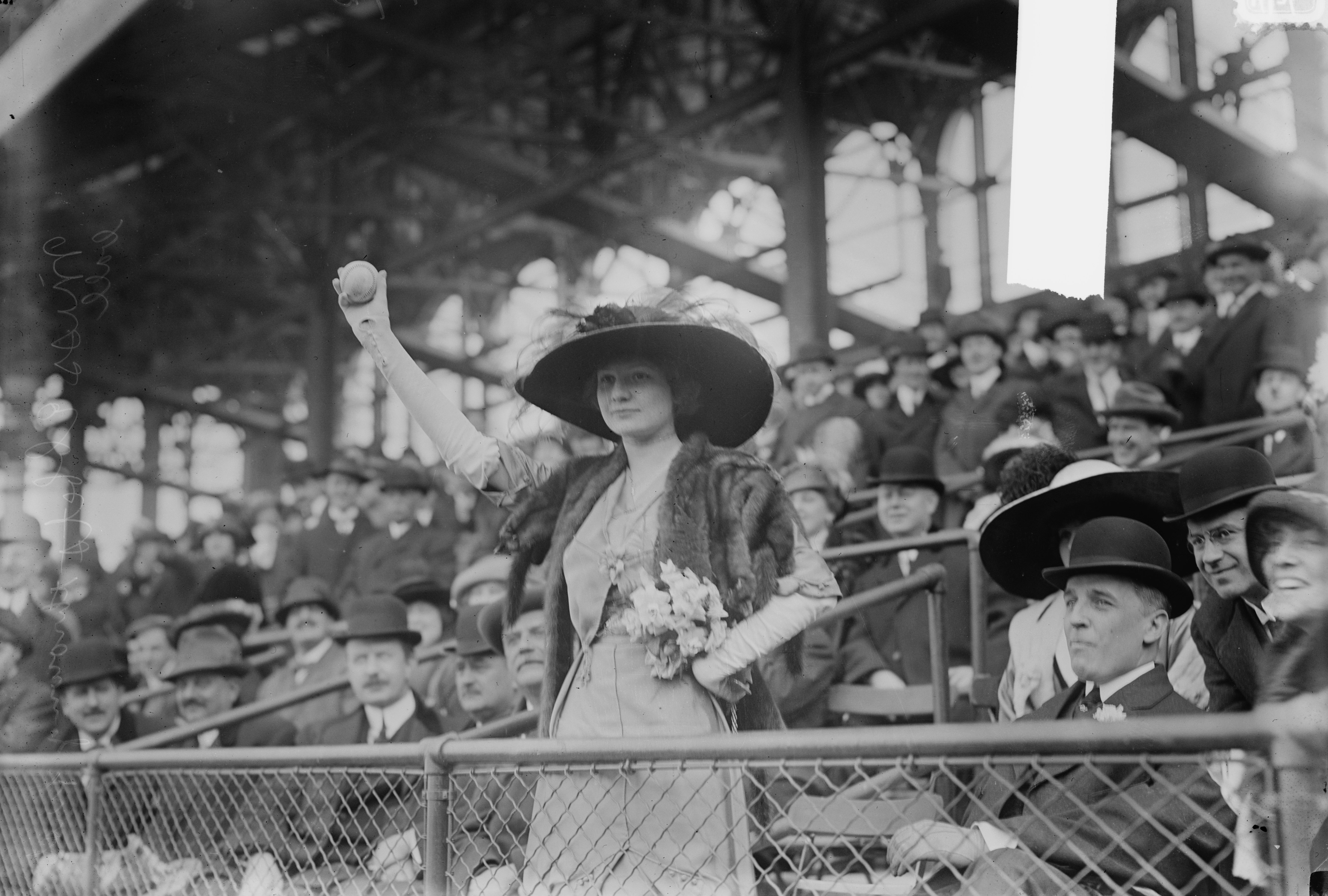
Genevieve Ebbets throwing the inaugural first pitch at the opening day of Ebbets Field

- The new constitution for the Republic of Nicaragua came into effect, providing for a 40-member Chamber of Deputies and a 13-member Senate.
- U.S. Navy destroyer Duncan was launched by Fore River Shipyard in Quincy, Massachusetts. It would serve briefly in World War I before it was decommissioned in 1922.
- Ebbets Field opened as the new home of baseball's Brooklyn Superbas (later the Dodgers), who played an exhibition game against the newly renamed New York Yankees (formerly the New York Highlanders) from the rival American League. The Superbas won the game, 3–2, before 25,000 fans. Genevieve Ebbets, daughter of Dodgers owner Charles Ebbets, threw the honorary first pitch.
- The United States of America Foot Ball Association, now the United States Soccer Federation (USSF), was founded. The word "soccer" would not be made part of the organization name until 1945 (as the United States Soccer Football Association), and the word "football" would not be dropped until the USSF adopted its present name in 1974.
- Physicist Niels Bohr completed his groundbreaking paper concerning quantum theory of the hydrogen atom.
- Spanish pianist Ricardo Viñes conducted the first public performance of Veritables Preludes flasques (pour un chien) by French composer Erik Satie during a concert at the Salle Pleyel in Paris. Satie used the occasional advertise that more compositions were coming in the same humorous style.
- Died: Gheorghe Grigore Cantacuzino, 79, Prime Minister of Romania 1899–1900 and 1906–1907 (b. 1833)

== April 6, 1913 (Sunday) ==
- The Bucharest Academy of Economic Studies (Academia de Studii Economice din București or ASE) was founded by decree of King Carol of Romania. It would have more than 35,000 undergraduate and 1,600 masters and doctoral students by the time of its centennial in 2013.
- A rail station opened in Keswick to serve the Seaford railway line in Adelaide, Australia.
- Born: Otto Schmitt, American engineer, pioneer of biomedical engineering, credited with coining the term biometrics; in St. Louis (d. 1998)

== April 7, 1913 (Monday) ==
- Champ Clark was re-elected Speaker of the United States House of Representatives.

== April 8, 1913 (Tuesday) ==
- China inaugurated its first elected Parliament at Beijing, with more than 500 of the 596 Representatives and 177 of the 274 Senators present when the assembly opened at 11:00 am.
- The Seventeenth Amendment to the United States Constitution was ratified by Connecticut, which became the 36th of the 48 states to favor the amendment for direct election of United States senators. The measure passed the state House, 150-77, and then passed unanimously by the state Senate.
- U.S. President Woodrow Wilson broke a 100-year tradition and personally appeared before a joint session of United States Congress to speak in support of a bill on tariffs.
- Charles F. O'Neall was elected mayor of San Diego with 52% of the vote.
- Norwegian ocean liner Bergensfjord was launched by Cammell Laird in Birkenhead, England as the second major ship for the Norwegian America Line.
- German steamship Solfels was launched by Joh. C. Tecklenborg in Wesermünde, Germany to serve the Hansa Line. She was captured by the Royal Navy in World War I and recommissioned as SS Empire Advocate in 1919.
- Born:
  - Sourou-Migan Apithy, Beninese state leader, second President of Dahomey 1964–1965; in Porto-Novo, French Dahomey (now Benin) (d. 1989)
  - Benedict J. Semmes Jr., American naval officer, commander of the USS Picking during World War II and the United States Second Fleet during the Cold War, recipient of the Navy Cross and Navy Distinguished Service Medal; in Memphis, Tennessee (d. 1994)
  - Carlton Skinner, American public servant, first civilian Governor of Guam, 1949–1953; in Palo Alto, California (d. 2004)

== April 9, 1913 (Wednesday) ==
- Ebbets Field, the new home of baseball's Brooklyn Dodgers at 55 Sullivan Place, hosted its first official game. The stadium, which was the smallest in the National League, could hold 25,000 people, and bad weather limited the attendance to 10,000 in a 1–0 loss to the Philadelphia Phillies. The Dodgers would play their last game there on September 24, 1957, and it would host a Negro league contest, with the Havana Cubans defeating the Kansas City Monarchs 6-4 as its final baseball game on August 23, 1959. Demolition would begin on February 23, 1960, and apartments now stand on the site.

== April 10, 1913 (Thursday) ==
- The New York Yankees played their first official game with their new name, losing 2–1 in Washington, D.C. to the Senators.
- The opera L'amore dei tre re by composer Italo Montemezzi premiered at La Scala in Milan.
- The soccer football club Slavia Sofia was established in Sofia, Bulgaria.
- Born: Stefan Heym, German writer, author of Goldsborough and Ahasver; as Helmut Flieg, in Chemnitz (d. 2001)

== April 11, 1913 (Friday) ==
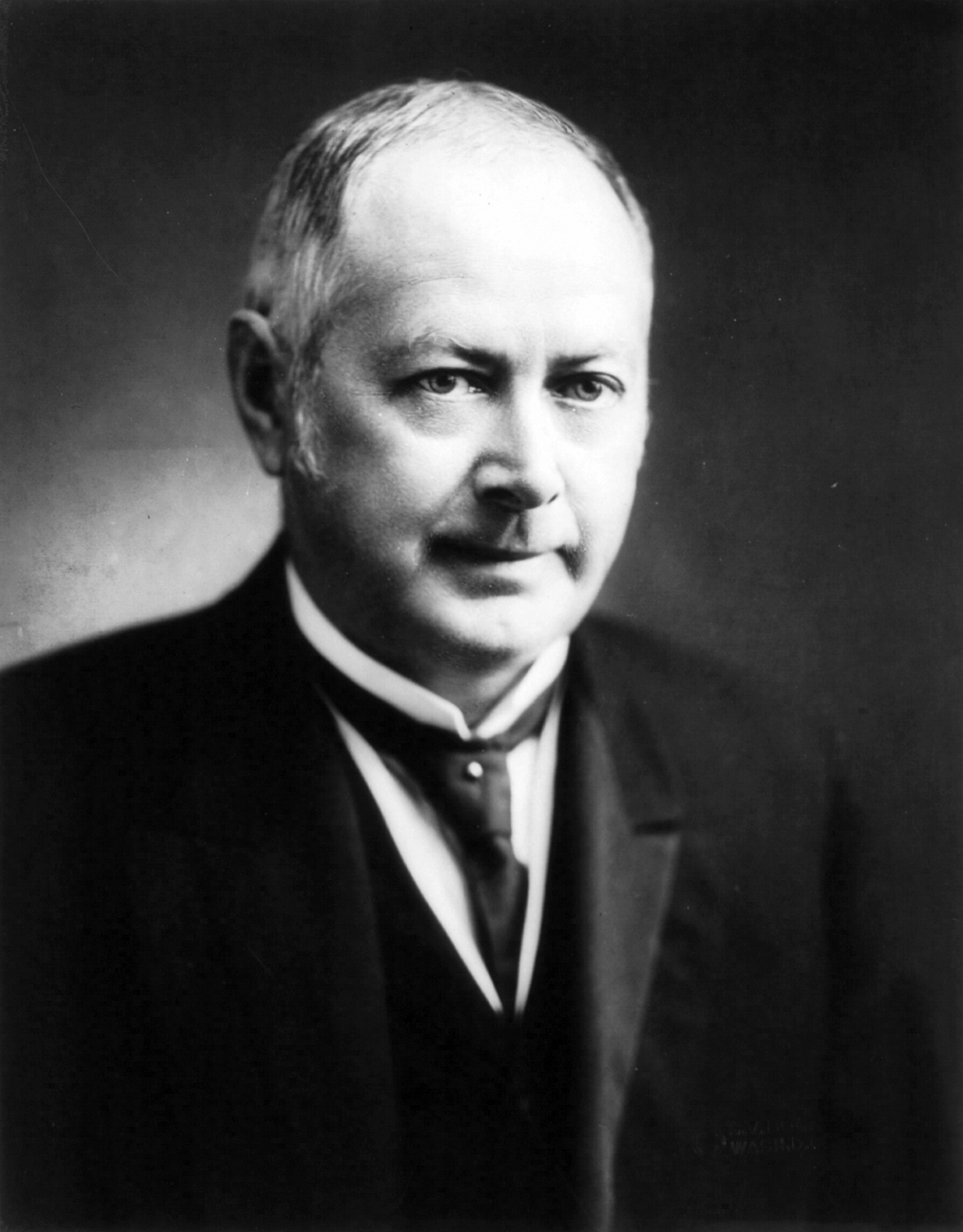
Postmaster General Albert S. Burleson

- Albert S. Burleson, the new U.S. Postmaster General, proposed the segregation of white and black federal employees in the postal service, at a cabinet meeting with President Woodrow Wilson. Navy Secretary Josephus Daniels wrote in his diary that Burleson advocated separation of the races in the railway mail service, "and he was anxious to segregate White and Negro employees in all Departments of the Government." Wilson made no objection to Burleson's suggestion, implying that segregation within a federal office was left to the choice of each cabinet member. By the end of the year, separate bathrooms and lunchrooms were set aside for black and white workers at the Post Office Department. U.S. Treasury Secretary William Gibbs McAdoo implemented racial segregation at the Bureau of Engraving and Printing, and Daniels had done the same at the office of the Auditor of the Navy, and layoffs of black federal employees took place in the South during 1914.
- Nathaniel Griffith Lerotholi was named as the new Paramount Chief of Basutoland (now the Kingdom of Lesotho) with the agreement of other tribal chiefs and the British Resident Commissioner. Chief Griffith would reign until his death on June 23, 1939.
- The local Ladies Improvement Association established a public library in Delray Beach, Florida.
- The cricket pavilion at the Nevill Ground was destroyed in an arson attack that was attributed to militant suffragettes as part of a country-wide campaign co-ordinated by the Women's Social and Political Union.
- The sports club Francesa was established in Del Viso, Greater Buenos Aires, Argentina. It is known for its rugby and field hockey programs.
- Born: Oleg Cassini, French-born American fashion designer, best known for his designs for Jacqueline Kennedy Onassis; as Oleg Cassini Loiewski, in Paris (d. 2006)

== April 12, 1913 (Saturday) ==
- The British weekly magazine New Statesman was founded by Sidney Webb and Beatrice Webb, with financial backing by George Bernard Shaw.
- The British Ecological Society, an environmentalist organization that was the first of its kind in history, was founded by 47 persons who had been invited by the British Vegetation Committee. An American counterpart, the Ecological Society of America, would be created in 1915.
- The Tintenpalast buildings opened in Windhoek, German South West Africa to house the German colonial administration. They now house the Parliament of Namibia.
- The city of San Marino, California, was incorporated by Henry E. Huntington, who owned 75% of the land on which the city was built, and other landowners. George S. Patton Sr., father of U.S. Army general George S. Patton, served as the city's first mayor.
- Born: Sabah Al-Salim Al-Sabah, Emir of Kuwait 1965–1977; in Kuwait City (d. 1977)
- Died: John B. Henderson, 86, U.S. Senator from Missouri from 1862 to 1869, and co-author of the Thirteenth Amendment to the United States Constitution which outlawed slavery (b. 1826)

== April 13, 1913 (Sunday) ==
- Anarchist Rafael Sancho Alegre fired three shots at King Alfonso as he was riding through the streets of Madrid. It was the eighth attempt on the life of the King, who was uninjured and would reign until 1931.
- José Bordas Valdez was elected as President of the Dominican Republic by the national legislature.
- Mexican Army troops under the command of General Pedro Ojeda, who had been fighting rebels at the border town of Naco, Sonora state, fled across the border into Naco, Arizona in order to surrender to the United States Army.
- A replica of the Thomas Jefferson statue by sculptor Karl Bitter was unveiled at the Jefferson Memorial Building in St. Louis, on the day of the U.S. President's 170th birthday.
- Sports club Surnadal was established in Surnadal Municipality, Norway where its known for its association football, handball, alpine skiing and Nordic skiing programs.
- Born:
  - Charles E. Whittingham, American horse trainer, most awarded trainer in American race horse history; in Chula Vista, California (d. 1999)
  - John E. Moss, U.S. Representative for California from 1953 to 1979, advocate for the development of the Freedom of Information Act; in Hiawatha, Utah (d. 1997)
- Died: Auguste Victor Louis Verneuil, 66, French chemist who developed the Verneuil method for the first commercially successful manufacture of synthetic gemstones (b. 1856)

== April 14, 1913 (Monday) ==
- A group of 200,000 Belgian workers went on strike in protest over the government's failure to approve the abolition of the "plural vote" system. Under the existing law, Belgian men who were 25 or older could have as many as three votes, with extra voting rights awarded for marriage, land ownership, a university degree or government employment. The Labour Party had sought a rule for one vote for any Belgian citizen over the age of 21. The Belgian government revised the constitution a week later and the strike ended.
- The site for the Xrobb l-Għaġin Temple was surveyed by archaeologist Themistocles Zammit near Marsaxlokk, Malta but excavation work would not begin until the following year.
- Born: Jean Fournet, French conductor, music director of the Rotterdam Philharmonic Orchestra and conductor for the Tokyo Metropolitan Symphony Orchestra, Lyric Opera of Chicago and Metropolitan Opera; in Rouen, Seine-Maritime département (d. 2008)
- Died: Carl Hagenbeck, 68, German zoologist who provided many of the circus performing animals for P. T. Barnum, founder of the Tierpark Hagenbeck zoo in Hamburg (b. 1844)

== April 15, 1913 (Tuesday) ==
- The first issue of Scouting, the magazine of the Boy Scouts of America, was published, originally as a semi-weekly newsletter. In its 100th year, the magazine would be published five times a year.
- Died: Ğabdulla Tuqay, 26, Russian Tatar poet, founder of modern Tatar literature, died of tuberculosis (b. 1886)

== April 16, 1913 (Wednesday) ==
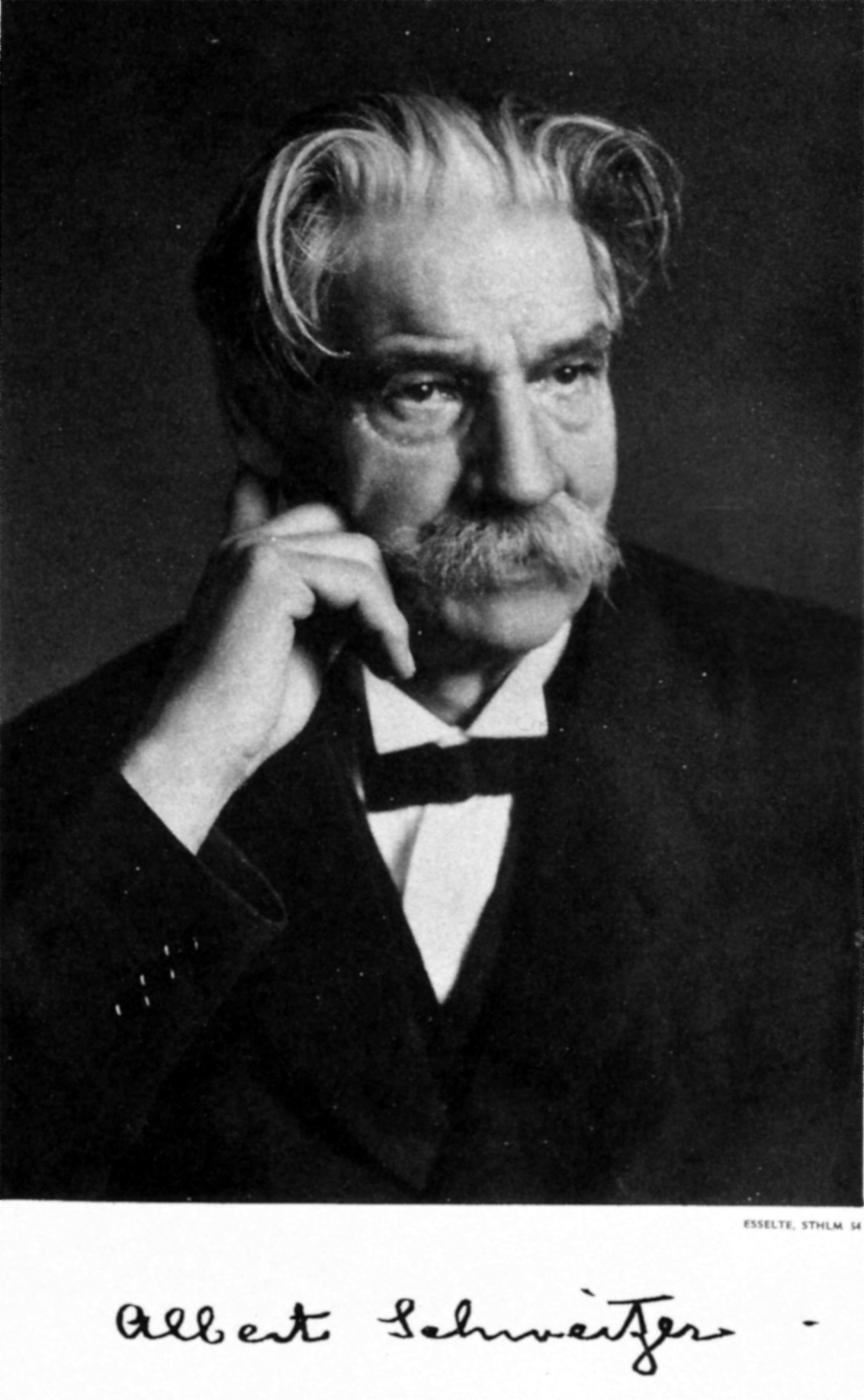
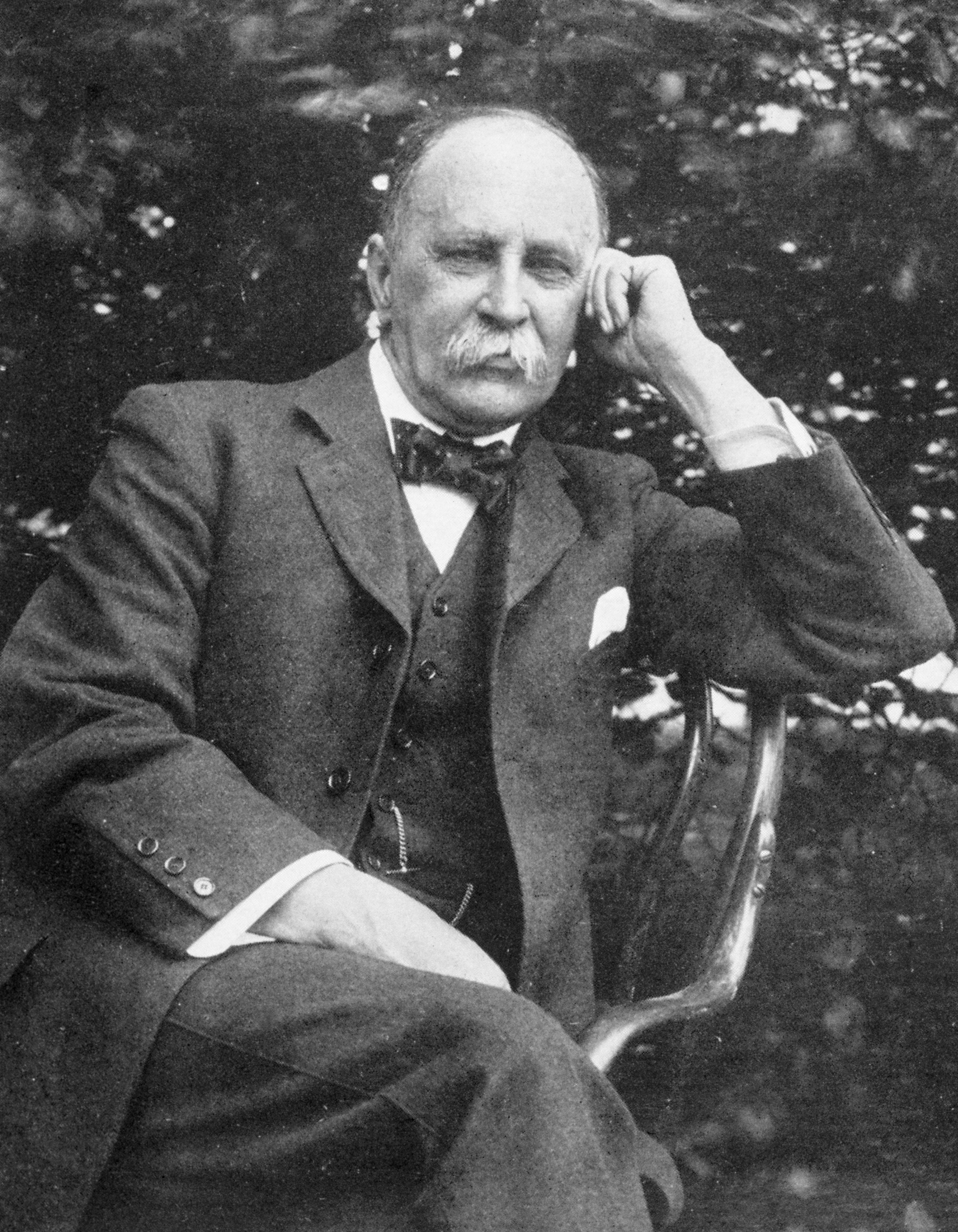
Physicians Schweitzer and Osler
- The California State Assembly passed the Alien Land Act, prohibiting Japanese aliens from owning real estate in that state, which resulted in mob protests in Japan. Despite appeals from U.S. President Woodrow Wilson and an address to the legislature by United States Secretary of State William Jennings Bryan, the state Senate would pass the bill on May 9, and the measure would be signed into law, with the Japanese government protest being so strong that the U.S. made preparations for a possible war with Japan.
- Albert Schweitzer arrived in Lambaréné, Gabon, beginning his mission to Africa, combining evangelism with the founding of a hospital.
- The 1st Squadron of the Belgian Air Component was established as the 1re Escadrille de Chasse, the first military air unit in Belgium.
- Less than ten years after the first successful airplane flight, the first Schneider Trophy airplane race, held in Monaco, was won by French pilot Maurice Prévost, who flew his Deperdussin Coupe Schneider at an average speed of 45.71 miles per hour (73.56 km/h) for six laps and a total distance of 300 kilometers or 190 miles.
- The term neuropsychology was coined by a Canadian physician William Osler in a speech made at the opening ceremonies of the Phipps Psychiatric Clinic at Johns Hopkins University.
- George Tupou, King of Tonga, established the Order of the Crown of Tonga to be awarded for those who made exceptional service to the Crown of Tonga.
- Born: Les Tremayne, English-born American actor, best known for his dramatic radio programs The Falcon and Abbott Mysteries; in London (d. 2003)
- Died: Jerry Harrington, 44, former Major League Baseball catcher and assistant police chief of Keokuk, Iowa, was struck in the head and killed with a beer can thrown by Tom Merritt.

== April 17, 1913 (Thursday) ==
- Bulgaria and Turkey agreed to a six-day ceasefire in hostilities during the First Balkan War, to last until April 23.
- Some 20,000 protesters gathered in Tokyo to cheer various speakers who were demanding that Japan declare war on the United States in response to the impending Alien Land Act being considered by the California state legislature.
- Arthur Sifton retained his seat as Premier of Alberta after the Alberta Liberal Party defeated the Conservatives during provincial elections.
- The record for number of persons killed in an aviation accident was tied when the French Army balloon Zodiac suddenly deflated at an altitude of 650 feet (200 m), then plunged to the ground in the Parisian suburb of Noisy-le-Grand, killing all five people on board.
- Athletic Park opened in Vancouver as a baseball venue although it also hosted football, lacrosse, and other sport events.
- Born: Miss Read (pen name for as Dora Jessie Shafe), British novelist best known for the Fairacre and Thrush Green series; in London (d. 2012)
- Died: Agnes McLaren, 75, Scottish physician, first female physician to administer medical care for women in India (b. 1837)

== April 18, 1913 (Friday) ==
- French General Joseph Joffre presented "Plan XVII" to the Supreme War Council, in what would become the basis for French military strategy during World War I in the event of an invasion by Germany. General Joffre's plan, approved by the War Ministry on May 2, assumed that the German Army would come across the German-French border, and failed to have any contingency for what Germany would do in 1914, when it invaded Belgium and then crossed the Belgian-French border.
- Bulgarian Prime Minister Ivan Evstratiev Geshov informed the parliament, the Naradno Sabranie, that the Kingdom of Bulgaria had accepted the proposal of the Great Powers to end the war with Turkey.
- Royal Navy cruiser Nottingham was launched by Pembroke Dockyard in Pembrokeshire, Wales. She would serve with the Grand Fleet in World War I before being sunk by a German U-boat in 1916.
- The weekly American newspaper Frostburg Mining Journal of Frostburg, Maryland, published its final issue. The paper's publisher, the Mining Journal Publishing Company, went under and was bought out by Peter L. Livengood in May. In September, Livengood commenced publishing of the paper in September under a new name, The Frostburg Spirit, before it was sold again in 1915 and original name was revived. The paper ceased its operations in 1917.
- Born: Jack Pope (Andrew Jackson Pope Jr.), American judge, Chief Justice of the Supreme Court of Texas 1982–1985; in Abilene, Texas (d. 2017)
- Died: Lester Frank Ward, 71, American sociologist, and first president of the American Sociological Association (b. 1841)

== April 19, 1913 (Saturday) ==
- Bulgaria and Serbia signed an armistice with the Ottoman Empire, but Montenegro refused to participate.
- U.S. President Woodrow Wilson sent a message to the California state Senate and House, urging the members not to pass legislation aimed at barring Japanese persons from owning land in that state, requesting them to pass a broader law that would affect all aliens.
- Luis Mena, rebel general who had briefly served as the President of Nicaragua in August 1910 before being ousted by American intervention, was released from confinement in the Panama Canal Zone by orders of U.S. President Woodrow Wilson.
- The two children of dancer Isadora Duncan were killed in an automobile accident, shortly after having dined with her in Paris. Deirdre Duncan, 6, and Patrick Duncan, 3, were drowned along with their governess, Annie Sim, when the car they were in rolled down a hill into the river Seine. Duncan herself would be killed in a freak accident on September 14, 1927, while a passenger in an automobile.
- Died: Hugo Winckler, 49, German archaeologist who was a leading expert on Assyrian cuneiform and the history of the Hittites, known for translating the Code of Hammurabi (b. 1863)

== April 20, 1913 (Sunday) ==
- The Provence was launched by Arsenal de Lorient as the first of three battleships in her class to serve in the Mediterranean Sea during World War I. She would also serve in World War II before being scuttled in 1942.
- Japanese Government Railways extended the Echigo Line in the Niigata Prefecture, Japan, with stations Yoita and Teradomari serving the line.

== April 21, 1913 (Monday) ==
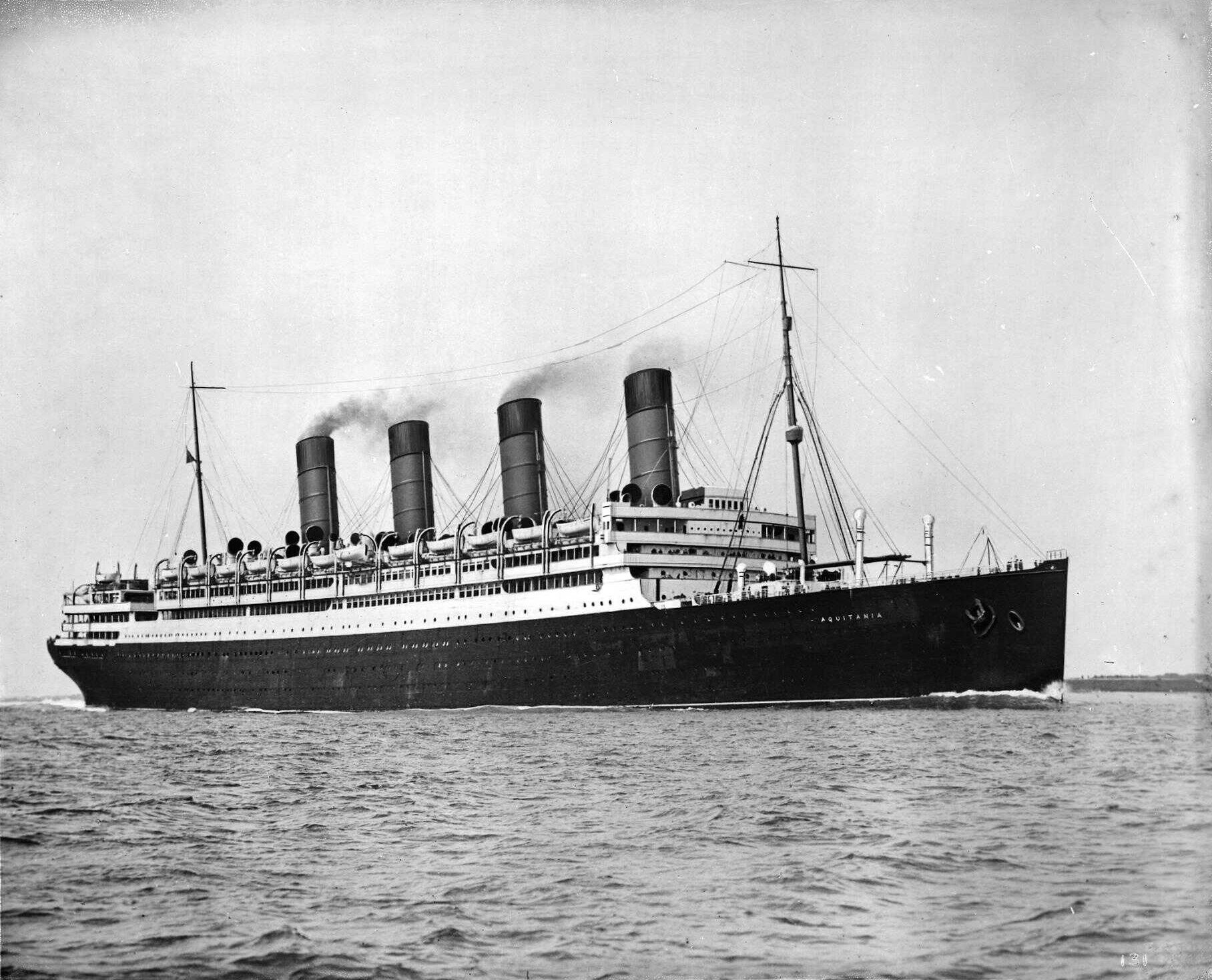
RMS Aquitania

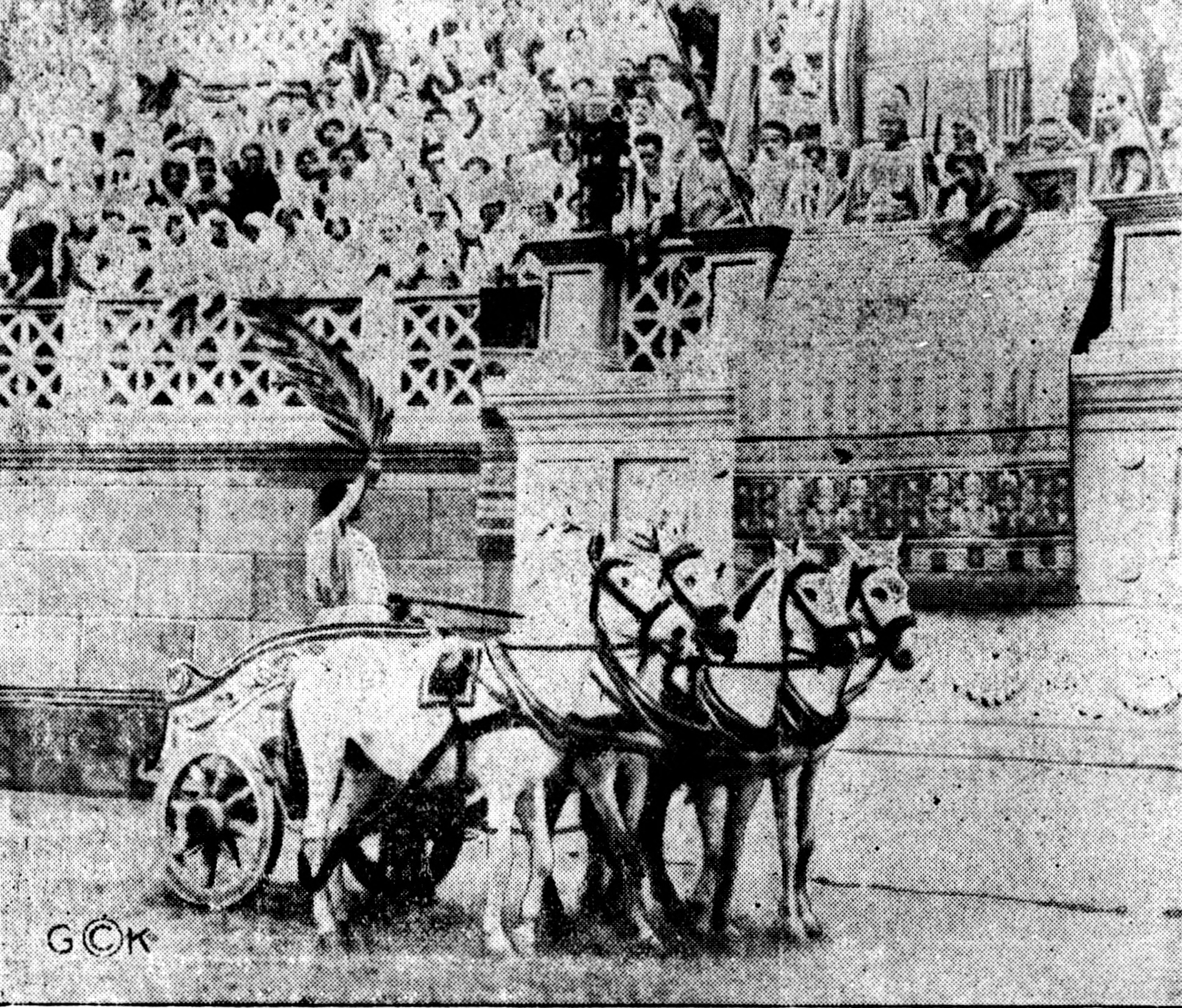
A scene from Quo Vadis

- Mario García Menocal was certified as the new President of Cuba.
- The 900 foot long Cunard luxury ocean liner RMS Aquitania, the largest British liner built up to that time, was launched on the River Clyde in Scotland before a crowd of 100,000 people
- The Bretagne was launched by Arsenal de Lorient as the second of three battleships in her class to serve in the Mediterranean Sea during World War I. She would also serve in World War II before being sunk by enemy fire in 1940.
- Three members of the France's infamous Bonnot Gang, Raymond Callemin, André Soudy and Élie Monier, were executed by guillotine at 4:30 a.m. All three were beheaded within 40 seconds of each other.
- Quo Vadis? became the first motion picture to be shown in a Broadway theater, normally reserved for plays, and attracted thousands of spectators at a time, all willing to pay one dollar to watch a two-hour feature film.
- Born: Richard Beeching, British engineer, designer of the modern railway system in the United Kingdom; in Sheerness, Isle of Sheppy, Kent (d. 1985)

== April 22, 1913 (Tuesday) ==
- The strike of 500,000 Belgian workers, seeking the right to vote, was ended after the Prime Minister of Belgium accepted a compromise proposed by the leader of the Liberals in Parliament.

== April 23, 1913 (Wednesday) ==
- An explosion at the Pittsburgh Coal Company mine at Courtney, Pennsylvania killed 96 miners.
- Mexico's government began the increased printing of paper currency in order to finance its armies during the revolution. The first issue put an additional five million pesos into circulation, but within two years, the government had printed 672,000,000 pesos, and other factions issued their own paper money. Between April and July, the inflation rate rose from 10% to 100%, and to nearly 1000% by April 1915 and 10,000% by April 1916 and more than 100,000% by September 1916.
- The Ottoman Turkish city of Iskodra (referred to as "Scutari" in the English-language press and "Shkodra" by Montenegro) surrendered to Montenegrin troops after six months of siege.
- The Duchess of Argyll unveiled the memorial to King Edward VII in Centenary Square, Birmingham, England.
- Born:
  - Maurice Fargues, French Navy diver and associate of Jacques Cousteau; in Avignon, Vaucluse département(d. 1947)
  - Dhananjay Keer, Indian author, known for his biographies including Mahatma Gandhi; as Anant Viththal Keer, in Ratnagiri, Bombay Province, British India (now Maharashtra state, India) (d. 1984)
- Died: Richard William Scott, 88, Canadian politician, Opposition Leader in the Senate of Canada from 1896 to 1906 (b. 1825)

== April 24, 1913 (Thursday) ==
- The 55-story Woolworth Building, designed by architect Cass Gilbert and located at 233 Broadway Street in New York City, officially opened as the tallest skyscraper in the world. At 7:30 pm in Washington, D.C., U.S. President Woodrow Wilson pushed a button that lit the 80,000 lights in the 792 foot high structure. The event, one commentator would write later, "ushered in the era of the great skyscraper". The Woolworth Building's reign as the tallest in the world would last until 1930.
- United States Secretary of State William Jennings Bryan met with diplomats in Washington, D.C. to present his plan for world peace, with the provision that all controversies between nations had to be submitted for investigation before a war could be declared.
- Italian battleship Duilio was launched by Regio Cantiere di Castellammare di Stabia in Naples, to serve as the second of two battleships in her class for defense against the Austro-Hungarian Navy.
- The soccer football Alumni Athletic Club of Buenos Aires dissolved after internal problems prevented them from playing any games in the 1912 Primera División season. Sports experts pointed to the club being too exclusive and mostly recruiting new players who were alumni from Buenos Aires English High School as part of club tradition, leading to fewer new players on the roster.
- The Shire of Jondaryan lost area to the newly established Shires of Millmerran and Pittsworth in Queensland, Australia.
- Born: Joe Vogler, American activist, founder of the Alaskan Independence Party; near Barnes, Kansas (d. 1993)

== April 25, 1913 (Friday) ==
- The "Cat and Mouse Act," officially named the Prisoners' Temporary Discharge for Ill-Health Act, was given royal assent in the United Kingdom. Proposed by Home Secretary Reginald McKenna in response to the use of the hunger strike by imprisoned suffragettes, the law provided that if a prisoner has a "condition of health... due in whole or in part to the prisoner's own conduct in prison," the Secretary of State could "authorise the temporary discharge of the prisoner" who, after recuperation, would return to prison to serve the remainder of the sentence, extended by the time on leave.
- The opera Panurge by Jules Massenet premiered nearly a year after the composer's death at Théâtre de la Gaîté in Paris.
- Sports club Sk Brodd was established in Stavanger, Norway. It became IL Brodd when it merged with sports club Arbeidernes TIL in 1940.
- Born:
  - Douglas Mackiernan, American spy and the first CIA agent to be killed in the line of duty; in Mexico City, Mexico (d. 1950)
  - Earl Bostic, American jazz musician, saxophonist who pioneered the rhythm and blues style; as Eugene Earl Bostic, in Tulsa, Oklahoma (d. 1965)

== April 26, 1913 (Saturday) ==
- Leo Frank, the 29-year old superintendent of the National Pencil Company factory in Atlanta, Georgia, presented 13-year-old employee Mary Phagan her weekly pay after closing time. Mary's body was found the next morning at the bottom of an elevator shaft. Frank became the prime suspect in her murder, and was arrested three days later on April 29 for her murder. A prominent Jew in Atlanta and president of the city's B'nai B'rith, Leo Frank would be convicted of Mary's murder despite the absence of evidence linking him to the killing. Although his death sentence would be commuted in 1915 to life imprisonment, a mob of angry citizens would kidnap him from the prison farm and lynch him. In 1982, one of the witnesses in Frank's 1915 trial, Alonzo Mann, would admit that he had witnessed Jim Conley, the factory janitor, carrying Miss Phagan's body immediately after the killing.
- King Albert of Belgium opened the international exposition at Ghent.
- The Canadian Grenadier Guards Band was established in Montreal, which include Canadian composer Claude Champagne among the roster.
- French composer Erik Satie would complete his next humorous piano composition Descriptions automatiques but kept it secret from the public until its public performance by Spanish pianist and partner Ricardo Viñes.
- Born: Karl George, American, jazz musician, trumpet player for Count Basie and Stan Kenton; in St. Louis (d. 1978)

== April 27, 1913 (Sunday) ==
- Essad Pasha Toptani, former commander of the Turkish troops that had surrendered to Montenegro in the Siege of Scutari, proclaimed himself as King of Albania.
- The agreement for a $125,000,000 (£25,000,000) loan to China, from banks in five European nations, was signed in Beijing by the Chinese Prime Minister. The loan was at an interest rate of 5% per annum. Although the agreement was unconstitutional because it was not approved by the Parliament, President Yuan Shikai was able to use the funding to defeat his opponents in the civil war that followed.
- Albert Schweitzer opened his first hospital facility, a day after supplies had arrived at his remote location in Gabon, and began the first major medical treatment for the native African population.
- The town of Mayor Buratovich, Argentina was established.
- Born: Philip Abelson, American physicist and co-discoverer of the element neptunium; in Tacoma, Washington (d. 2004)

== April 28, 1913 (Monday) ==
- Four weeks after having been offered the Albanian throne, Prince Ferdinand, Duke of Montpensier, announced that he was declining the chance to become King of Albania. The Duke, whose candidacy was opposed by Italy and Austria-Hungary, announced his decision in a letter published in the newspaper Le Figaro. Ferdinand would die on January 30, 1924.
- After receiving a demand from the United Kingdom to pay $10,000,000 to settle a bond indebtedness, Guatemala appealed to the United States for aid.
- Royal Navy cruiser Lowestoft was launched by Chatham Dockyard in Chatham, Kent, England. It served throughout World War I before it was decommissioned and scrapped in 1931.
- The Cooyar railway line began operating between Oakey and Cooyar, Queensland, Australia. The rail line eventually closed in 1969.
- The National Museum of Fine Arts of Cuba opened in Havana after its society received a decree to operate on February 23. However, the museum site would be moved several times throughout the city before its current Palace of Fine Arts was built in 1955.
- The Four Southern Poets Monument was unveiled in Augusta, Georgia to commemorate state poets Paul Hamilton Hayne, Sidney Lanier, James Ryder Randall, and Abram Joseph Ryan.

== April 29, 1913 (Tuesday) ==
- Germany's Foreign Minister, Gottlieb von Jagow, said in a speech at the Reichstag that Germany would respect the guarantees of Belgium's neutrality, followed by Minister of War Josias von Heeringen, who pledged that "Germany will not lose sight of the fact that the neutrality of Belgium is guaranteed by international treaty." Germany would invade Belgium fifteen months later on its entry into World War I on August 2, 1914.

== April 30, 1913 (Wednesday) ==
- Municipal elections were held in New Zealand with James Parr elected by acclamation as Mayor of Auckland, and John Luke defeating incumbent David McLaren for Mayor of Wellington.
- Franklin Knight Lane, the new United States Secretary of the Interior, rescinded an order that had banned automobiles from entering Yosemite National Park and other parks, increasing the tourism in those areas. Lane wrote that "This form of transportation has come to stay, and to close the park against automobiles would be as absurd as the fight for many years made by old naval men against the adoption of steam in the navy."
- Born: Edith Fowke, Canadian folklorist, CBC Radio program Folk Song Time; as Edith Margaret Fulton, in Lumsden, Saskatchewan (d. 1996)
