= May 1913 =

Month of 1913

<<	May 1913					>>
Su	Mo	Tu	We	Th	Fr	Sa
				1	2	3
4	5	6	7	8	9	10
11	12	13	14	15	16	17
18	19	20	21	22	23	24
25	26	27	28	29	30	31

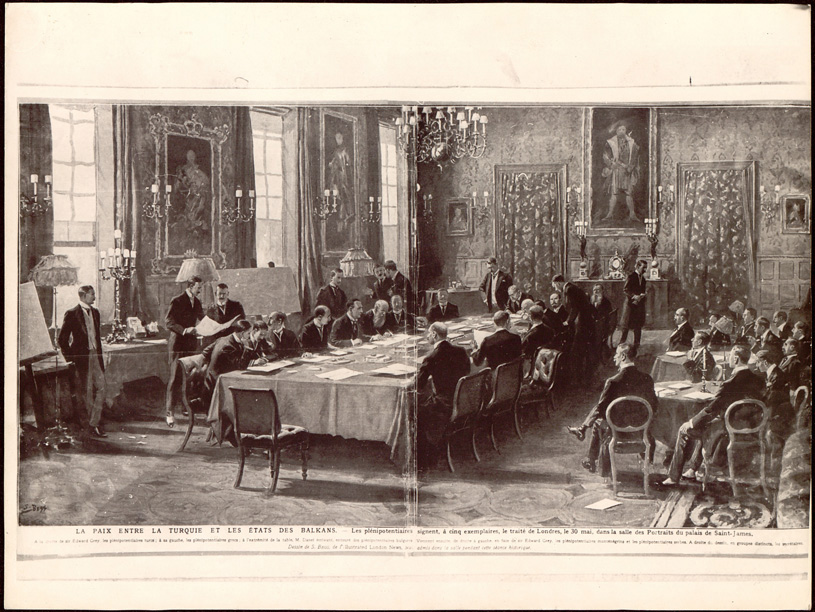
May 30, 1913: Treaty of London splits the Ottoman Empire

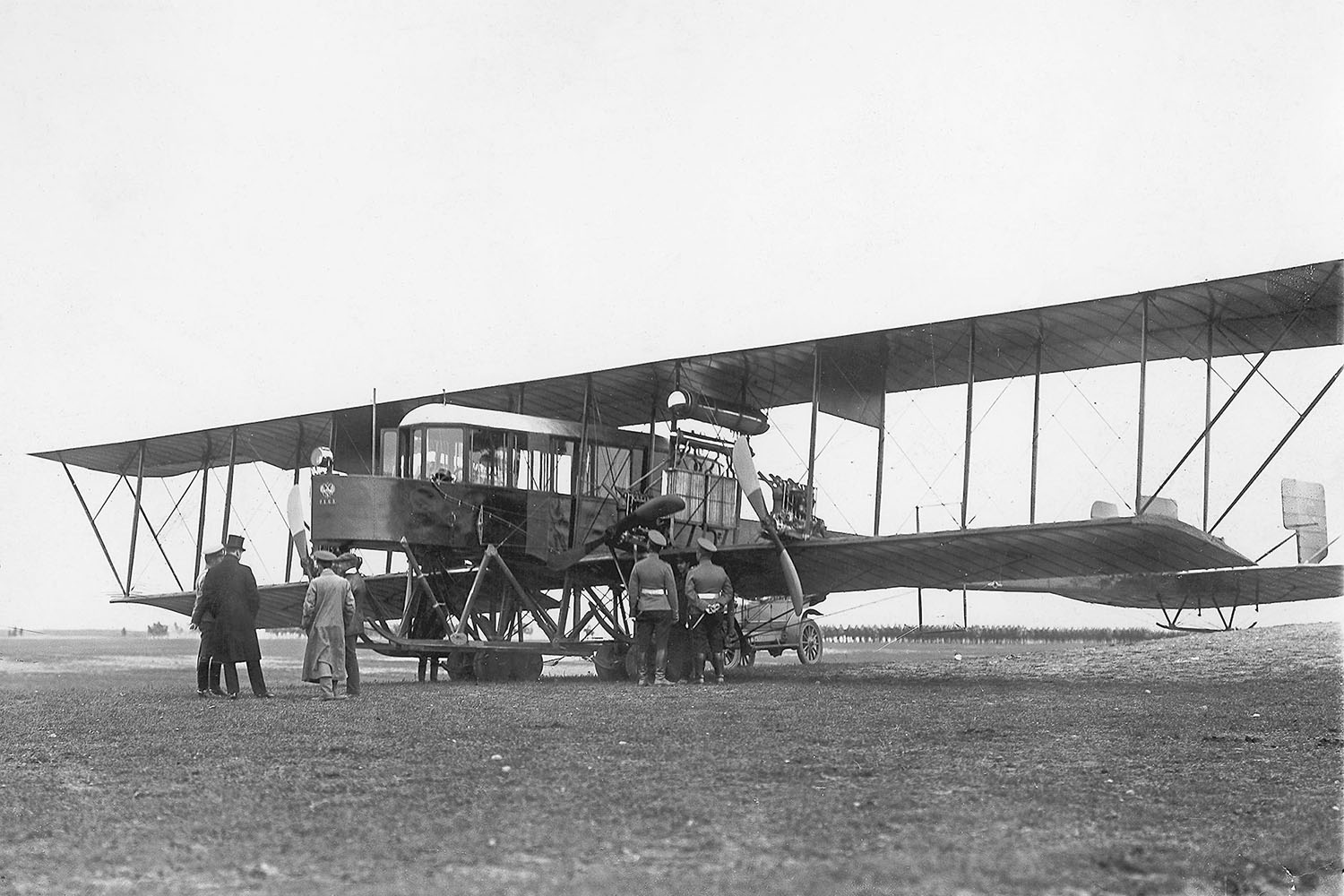
May 26, 1913: Igor Sikorsky introduces the first four-engine airplane, the Russky Vityaz bomber

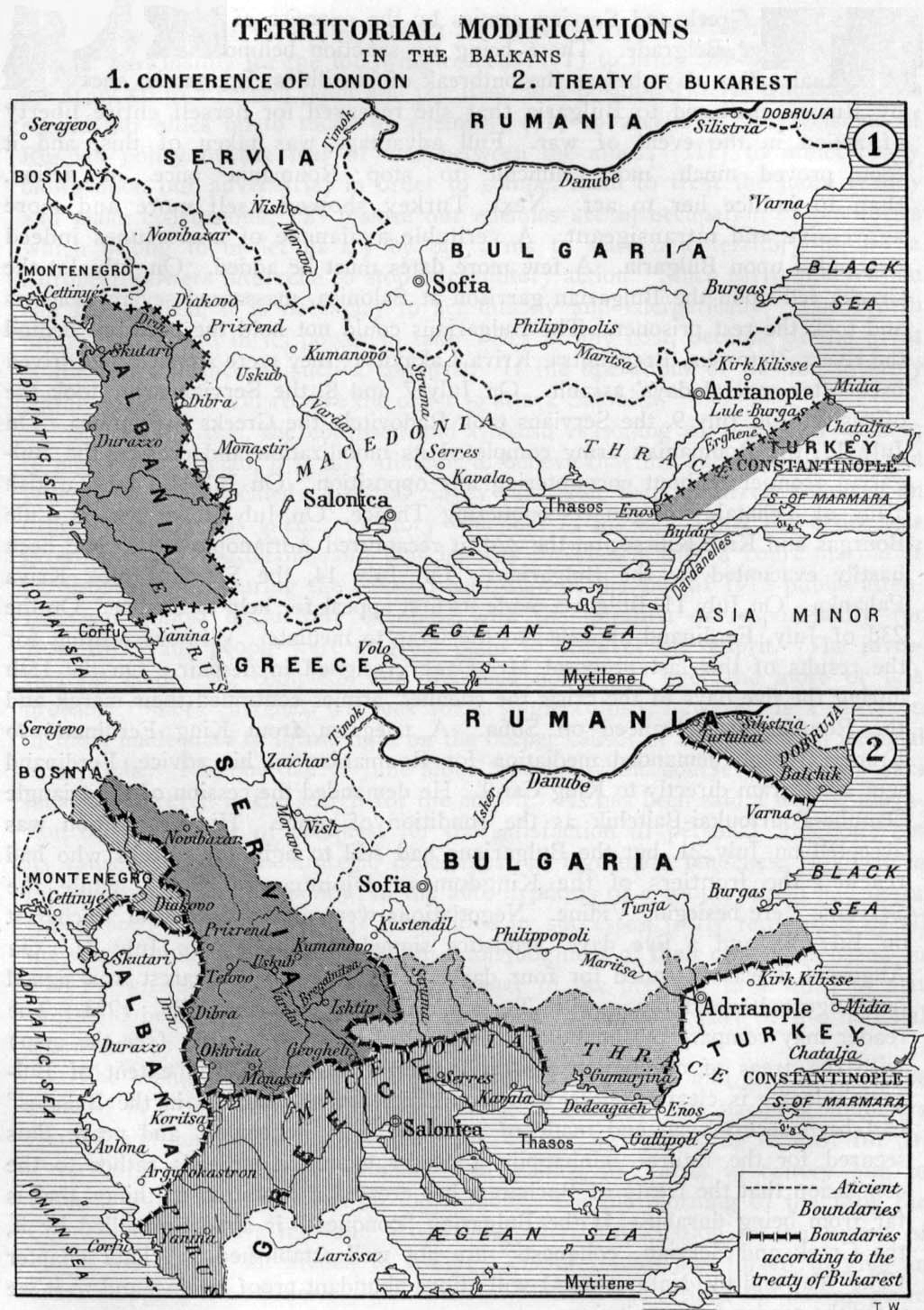
May 30, 1913: Eastern Europe, before and after

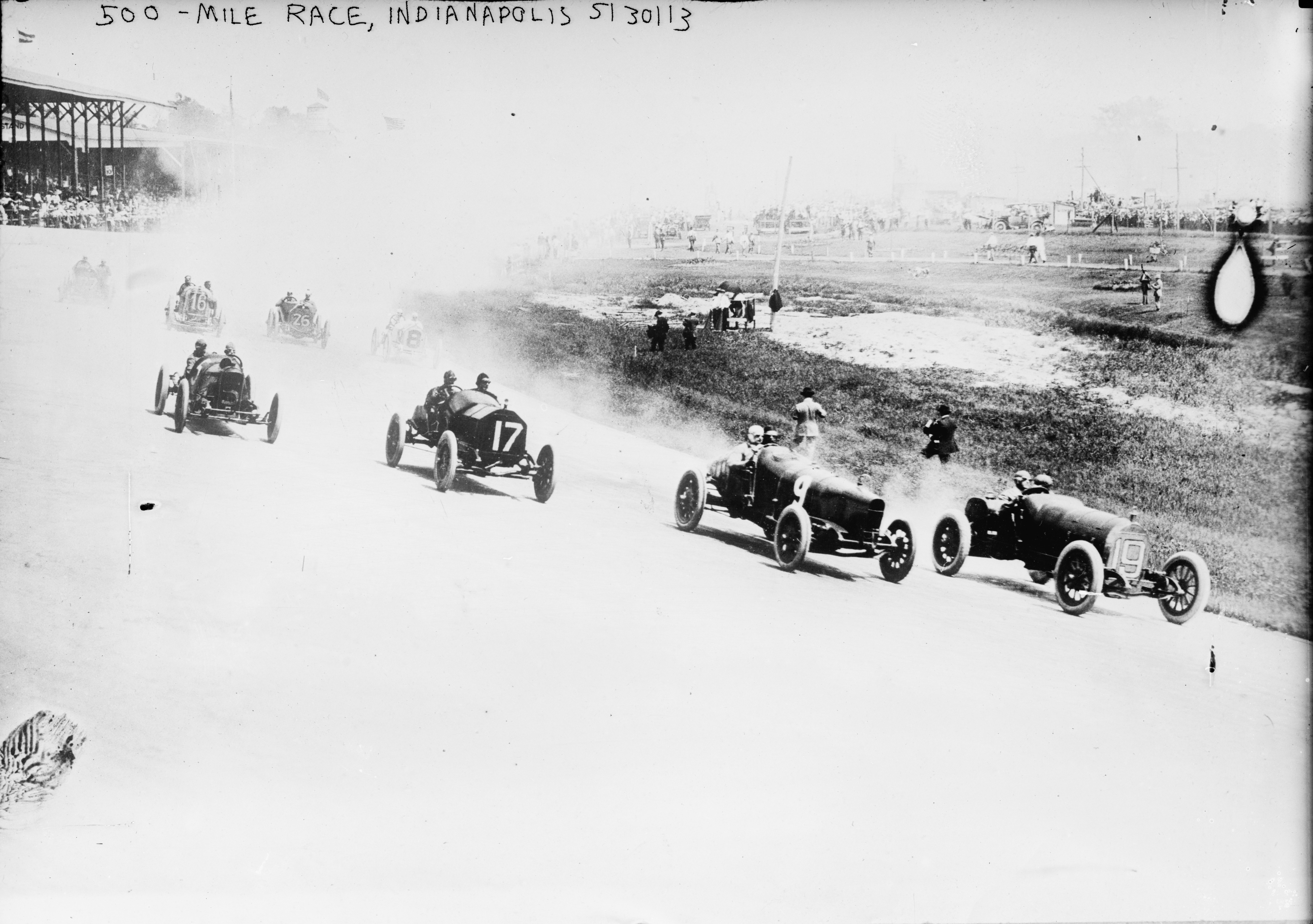
May 30, 1913: Jules Goux wins the 3rd Indianapolis 500

The following events occurred in May 1913:

== May 1, 1913 (Thursday) ==
- At the ambassador's conference in London, Montenegro offered to evacuate its newly conquered territory in Scutari, Albania, if it could receive territory elsewhere.
- The trade union Congreso Obrero de Filipinas was established in the Philippines.
- The Taiwan Railways Administration began operating the precursor to the Taitung rail line between Hualien and Taitung, Taiwan, with stations Fengtian and Guangfu serving the line.
- The Kilauea Light house was officially lit on the north side of Kauai, Hawaii.
- The sport club Parnahyba was established in Parnaíba, Brazil.
- Born:
  - Louis Nye, American comedian best known for his work on The Steve Allen Show; as Louis Neistat, in Hartford, Connecticut (d. 2005)
  - Victor Stafford Reid, Jamaican writer, author of New Day and The Leopard; in Kingston (d. 1987)
  - Walter Susskind, Czech conductor, music director for the St. Louis Symphony Orchestra, founder of the National Youth Orchestra of Canada; as Jan Walter Susskind, in Prague, Austria-Hungary (present-day Czech Republic) (d. 1980)
- Died: John Barclay Armstrong, 63, American law enforcer, U.S. Marshal who apprehended outlaw John Wesley Hardin (b. 1850)

== May 2, 1913 (Friday) ==
- The U.S. recognized the government of the new Republic of China, with American Chargé d'Affaires Edward T. Williams presenting U.S. President Woodrow Wilson's message to Chinese President Yuan Shikai. As the first world leader to give recognition to the Republic of China, Wilson acted without prior notice even to Congress.
- Tancrède Auguste, President of Haiti since August 1912, died suddenly, "a victim of severe anemia caused by advanced untreated syphilis, though most Haitians believed he was a victim of poison." His death set off a period of political unrest in the country for the next two years.

== May 3, 1913 (Saturday) ==
- The California State Senate passed the Alien Land Act, prohibiting Japanese persons from owning property in California, by a margin of 26-10 and the bill went to Governor Hiram Johnson for his signature.
- Ahkay Humar Mozumdar became the first believer in Hinduism to become a naturalized citizen of the United States, when U.S. District Judge Frank H. Rudkin of Spokane, Washington, administered him the oath. Mozumdar had filed suit two years earlier and was found entitled by the court on grounds that he was a "free white person".
- Clorox was established in Oakland, California as the first American commercial-scale liquid bleach manufacturer.
- Raja Harishchandra, the first full-length feature film in India, was released by director Dadasaheb Phalke, setting the format for Indian cinema. Although it was a silent movie, the premiere event at the Coronation Cinema in Bombay was accompanied by a live performance of music and chanting.
- The Federal League, which would become a challenger to baseball's National and American Leagues in 1914 and 1915, began play as a minor league with teams in Chicago, Cleveland, Indianapolis, Pittsburgh, St. Louis, and Covington, Kentucky (across the river from Cincinnati), with Cleveland and Covington tying 6–6 in a ten-inning game. The teams would play a 120-game schedule, ending on September 13.
- Born:
  - Heinz Kohut, Austrian-born American psychologist, best known for his development of self psychology; in Vienna, Austria-Hungary (present-day Austria) (d. 1981)
  - William Inge, American playwright, known for his plays including Bus Stop and Come Back, Little Sheba, recipient of the Pulitzer Prize for Drama for Picnic; in Independence, Kansas (d. 1973)

== May 4, 1913 (Sunday) ==
- Senator Michel Oreste was elected as the new President of Haiti by the Haitian Parliament. The city governor of Port-au-Prince attempted to attack the parliament building during voting, and was repulsed by the Haitian Army, while the U.S. gunboat USS Nashville stayed outside the harbor to be ready to intervene. Oreste would serve for only eight months, being overthrown on January 27, 1914.
- Ismael Montes was elected a second time as President of Bolivia.

== May 5, 1913 (Monday) ==
- Montenegro's King Nicholas agreed to turn over control of Scutari to a multinational force from the Great Powers.
- Greece and Serbia signed a secret agreement to fight together against Bulgaria, their recent ally in the First Balkan War.
- The Arizona House of Representatives, following the lead of California, passed a bill prohibiting ownership of land by "any alien who has not declared his intention of becoming a citizen." The state senate passed the bill one week later, and it was signed by Governor George W. P. Hunt on May 16.
- The Amir of Najd, Abdulaziz bin Abdulrahman Al Saud, entered Al Hasa with his troops and ended the Turkish occupation of the Eastern part of Arabia which has been ongoing since 1871.
- German battleship Grosser Kurfürst was launched by AG Vulcan in Hamburg as one of four ships in her class that would participate in the Battle of Jutland in 1916.
- The Chicago Opera House was demolished to make way for the new Conway Building in downtown Chicago.
- Died: Helen Carte, 60, Scottish theater executive, co-manager of the D'Oyly Carte Opera Company with husband Richard D'Oyly Carte (b. 1852)

== May 6, 1913 (Tuesday) ==
- A proposed women's suffrage bill failed to pass the United Kingdom's House of Commons, 219–266, on a vote following the second reading. Fifty of the "no" votes were from Irish members of Parliament, and Prime Minister H. H. Asquith voted against it as well.
- The Hague Court of Arbitration ordered the Kingdom of Italy to pay $32,800 damages to France for seizing the steamers Carthage and Manouba during the Italo-Turkish War.
- Henry H. Rose was elected Mayor of Los Angeles with 54% of the vote.
- Born:
  - Stewart Granger, British-born American actor known for adventure film roles in King Solomon's Mines and Scaramouche; as James Lablanche Stewart, in London (d. 1993)
  - Douglas Stewart, New Zealand-born Australian poet, known for his verse plays including The Fire on the Snow and Ned Kelly, literary editor of The Bulletin; in Eltham (d. 1985)
  - Marianne Appel, American artist, known for her mural work with the Works Progress Administration; in Woodstock, New York (d. 1988)
  - Angelo Herndon, American labor leader, famous defendant by the International Labor Defense in 1932; in Sweet Home, Arkansas (d. 1997)

== May 7, 1913 (Wednesday) ==
- Stunt performer Rodman Law, self-billed as "The Human Fly", climbed up the outside of the U.S. Capitol while both houses of Congress were in session, starting from the side of the building and then making his way up to the top of the Dome where he intending to place his hat on the statue at the top of the dome. A guard at the Capitol persuaded Law to go no further than the statue's base.
- HMS Hermes became the first Royal Navy seaplane carrier, after being outfitted with a crane from which planes on its deck could be lowered to sea and raised back again.
- Royal Navy cruiser Birmingham was launched by Armstrong Whitworth in Newcastle upon Tyne, England to serve in the Grand Fleet during World War I. She was eventually decommissioned in 1931.
- Spanish battleship Alfonso XIII was launched by Sociedad Española de Construcción Naval in Ferrol, Spain as part of the class assigned to the first squadron of the Spanish Navy. It would serve the fleet until 1937 when it struck a mine and sank.
- The controversial film, The Sons of a Soldier, produced by Alec B. Francis, was released by Eclair Pictures. The movie followed generations of a family fighting in America's wars from the American Revolution to the Spanish–American War, then gave a glimpse of a war between the U.S. and Japan in the then-future year of 1920.

== May 8, 1913 (Thursday) ==
- The Underwood Tariff Bill, sponsored by Alabama Congressman Oscar Underwood passed the United States House of Representatives, 281–139. Besides lowering the tariff charged on many products imported from abroad, the bill was the first step toward enacting a federal income tax.
- French aviator Messr. Frangeois set a new record by carrying six passengers in his airplane. The group of seven stayed aloft for 75 minutes.
- The American Newspaper Publishers Association was incorporated.
- Born:
  - Bob Clampett, American animator, best known for his work with the animated series Looney Tunes and 1950s children's television shows Time for Beany and Beany and Cecil; as Robert Clampett, in San Diego (d. 1984)
  - Sid James, South African-British comedian, regular in the Carry On film series; as Solomon Joel Cohen, in Johannesburg (d. 1976)
  - Fritzie Zivic, American boxer, World Welterweight Champion from 1940 to 1941; as Ferdinand Henry John Zivcich, in Pittsburgh (d. 1984)

== May 9, 1913 (Friday) ==
- Japan's ambassador to the United States, Chinda Sutemi, delivered a formal protest against California's Alien Land Act to U.S. Secretary of State William Jennings Bryan.
- William D. Coolidge applied for a patent for his invention of the x-ray tube, which "made the use of x-rays for medical diagnosis safe and convenient."
- Al-Hasa was captured from the Ottoman Turks by a guerrilla army led by Ibn Saud, the King of Najd, as he expanded the territory that he would eventually call Saudi Arabia.
- The Eldon Public Library, funded by the Carnegie Foundation, opened in Eldon, Iowa. It was added to the National Register of Historic Places in 1996.
- German-American financial investor Otto Hermann Kahn co-founded the Century Opera Company in New York City.
- The first episode of the Fantômas French film serial was released. Directed by Louis Feuillade and starring René Navarre in the title role, the series emphasis on mysteries and ending each episode with a cliffhangers made the thriller successful in its eight-episode run over 12 months.

== May 10, 1913 (Saturday) ==
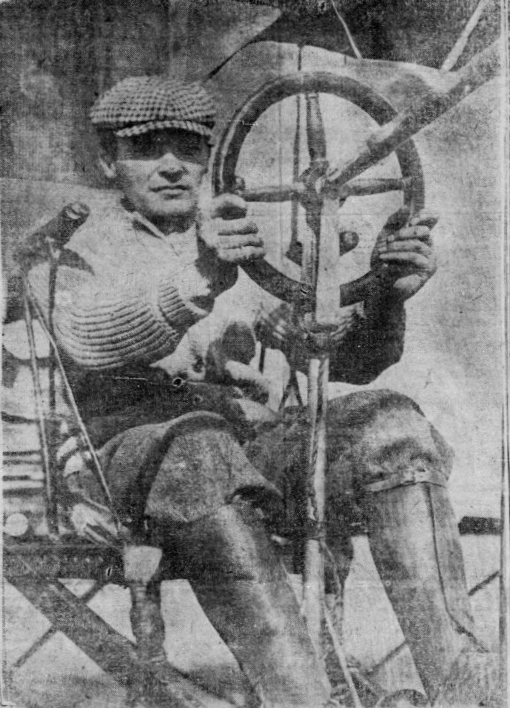
French aviator Didier Masson

- French aviator Didier Masson conducted the first aerial attack on a warship in the Western Hemisphere, attempting to drop pipe bombs onto the Mexican gunboat General Guererro, as well as the ships Democrata, 'Morelos, Tampico, and Oaxaca.
- U.S. Representative H. Olin Young of Michigan announced that he would resign his seat, because of a technicality that prevented his Progressive Party opponent, William Josiah MacDonald, from receiving 458 votes that would have given MacDonald the victory. MacDonald would take office on August 26 after being certified by the U.S. House Committee on elections.
- The United States Baseball League, an independent baseball league that had sought to challenge the existing National and American Leagues, but had only operated for only two months in 1912, made a second attempt to operate. Although it had eight teams (Baltimore, Brooklyn, New York City, Philadelphia and Washington, D.C., as well as Lynchburg, Virginia, Newark, New Jersey and Reading, Pennsylvania), the league folded after only three days, having played only seven games.

== May 11, 1913 (Sunday) ==
- A typhoon struck the Philippines, sweeping 16-foot waves across what is now the Albay province and killing 827 people.
- In recognition of the neutrality of Romania during the First Balkan War, the Bulgarian town of Silistra was awarded by an arbitration conference to the Romanians. The area is now part of Bulgaria.
- A rail station opened in Glenbrook, to serve the Main Western railway line in New South Wales, Australia.
- Born: Robert Jungk, German journalist, known for his non-fiction works including Brighter than a Thousand Suns; in Berlin (d. 1994)

== May 12, 1913 (Monday) ==
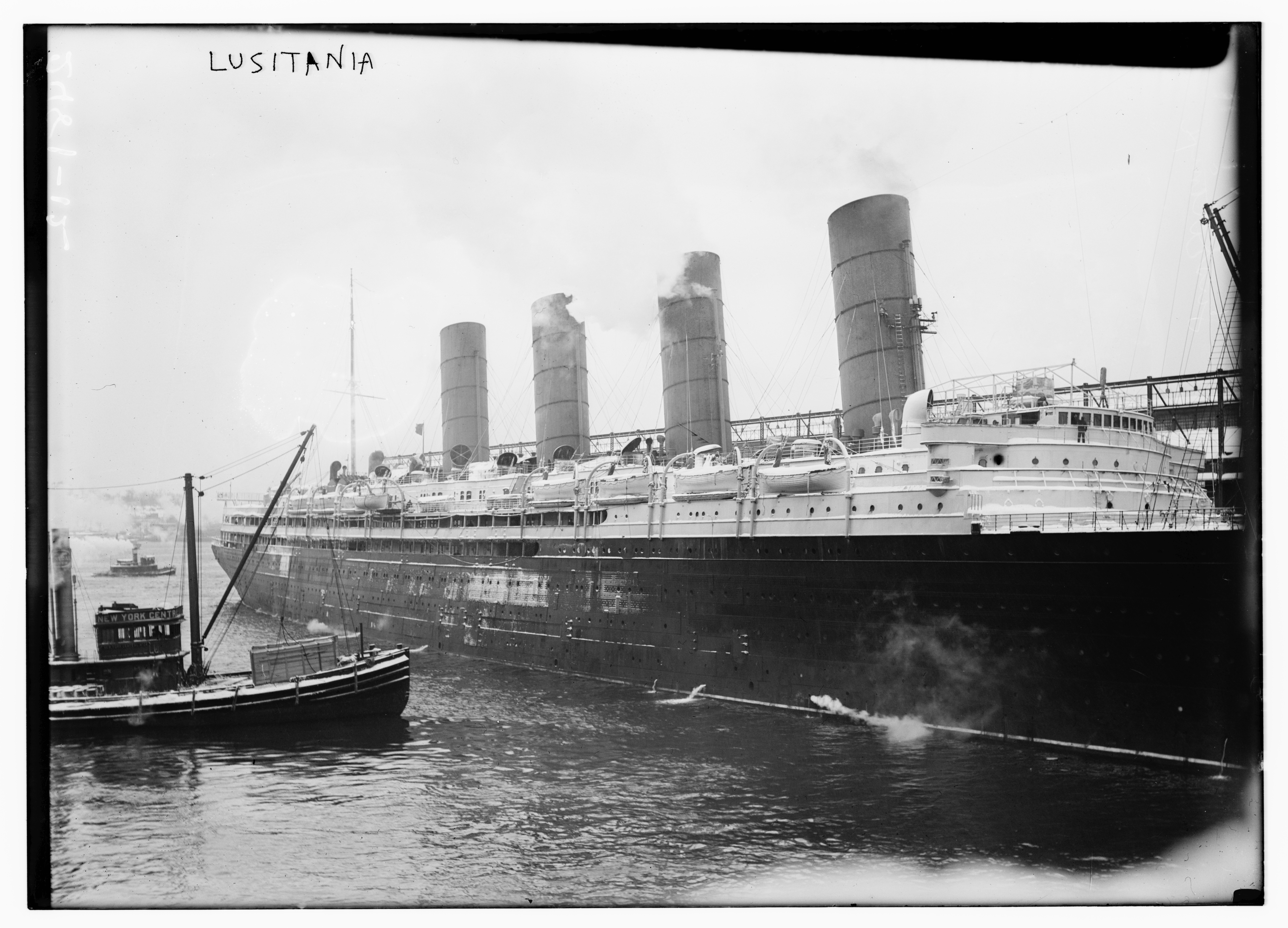
RMS Lusitania

- The British ocean liner RMS Lusitania was secretly refitted by the Royal Navy for use in the event of war. The ship would be torpedoed and sunk almost two years later, on May 7, 1915, with the loss of 1,195 lives, mostly civilians who had booked passage for a transatlantic trip.
- Patriarch Hermogenes was canonized as a saint in the Russian Orthodox Church, in a ceremony at the Assumption Cathedral in the Kremlin in Moscow.
- Died: John Sergeant Wise, 66, American politician, U.S. Representative from Virginia from 1883 to 1885 (b. 1846)

== May 13, 1913 (Tuesday) ==
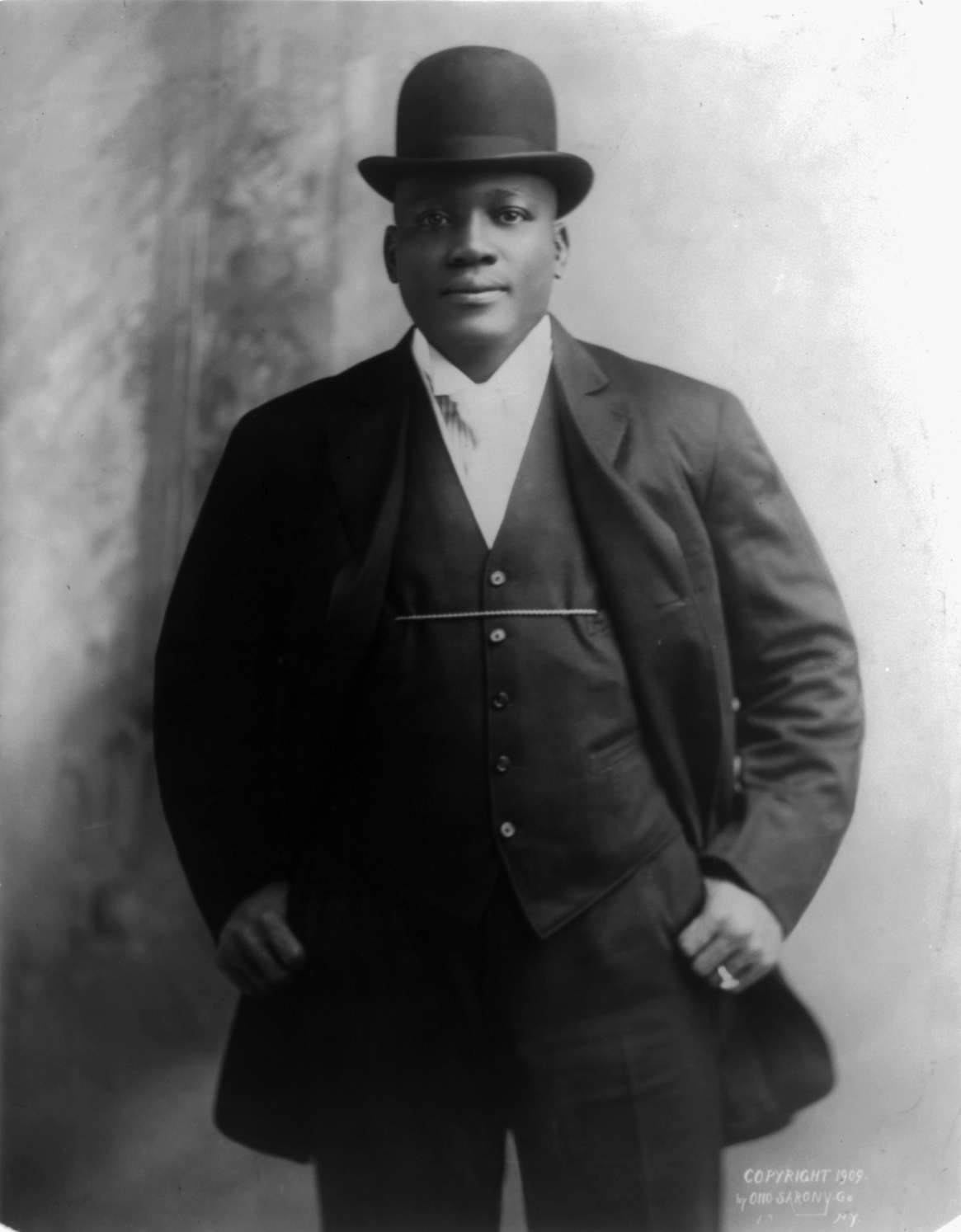
Boxer Jack Johnson

- Jack Johnson, the world heavyweight boxing champion, was convicted by a jury in Chicago of violating the Mann Act, after being charged with taking a minor across state lines for immoral purposes. Johnson had been indicted on November 7 after Belle Schreiber, a white prostitute, testified that he had paid for her to travel by train to Pittsburgh to be with him. While the one-year prison sentence and $1,000 fine were on appeal, Johnson would flee the U.S., not returning until 1920 to serve his time.
- The Cross of Valour was established as the second highest military decoration in Greece.
- The football club Sparta Brodnica was established in Brodnica, Poland.
- Born: William Tolbert, 20th President of Liberia from 1971 to 1980; in Bensonville (assassinated, 1980)

== May 14, 1913 (Wednesday) ==
- New York Governor William Sulzer approved the charter for the Rockefeller Foundation, which began operations with a $100,000,000 donation from John D. Rockefeller.
- Montenegro completed its evacuation of Scutari and turned the city, which it had captured only three weeks earlier, over to the multinational troops of the five Great Powers (Austria-Hungary, France, Germany, Russia, and the United Kingdom).
- The first $1.2 million installment of the $125 million loan to China was advanced by the consortium of European banks.
- Guatemala agreed to resume interest payments to the United Kingdom on its debt.

== May 15, 1913 (Thursday) ==
- The ballet Jeux, choreographed by Vaslav Nijinsky, with music by Claude Debussy, was premiered in Paris as the first offering of the Théâtre des Champs-Élysées. The feature ran for two weeks before another Najinsky work, The Rite of Spring, premiered at the theater on May 29.
- The Apostolic Prefecture of Betafo was established in Madagascar. It would become the Roman Catholic Diocese of Antsirabe in 1955.
- The town of Drumheller, Alberta was established.

== May 16, 1913 (Friday) ==
- Bremen Airport was established by the Bremen city government.
- The District Court in Vienna, approved the release of inheritance money to a 24-year-old artist, Adolf Hitler, under the terms of the will of his late father, Alois Hitler. Adolf, who lived at 27 Meldemannstrasse in Vienna, received 839 kronen, worth about US$168 (equivalent to $3,800 a century later), and moved a week later to neighboring Germany.
- A hoard of 81 Bronze Age gold objects was discovered during an excavation for a factory in Oberbarnim, Eberswalde, Germany.
- The town of Rocky Mountain House, Alberta was established.
- Born: Woody Herman, American jazz musician, saxophone player and bandleader for "The Herd"; as Woodrow Charles Herman, in Milwaukee (d. 1987)

== May 17, 1913 (Saturday) ==
- Two Cuban aviators, Agustin Parla and Domingo Rosillo, made the first airplane flight between the U.S. and Cuba, taking off from Key West and landing in Havana.
- Died: Heinrich Martin Weber, 71, German mathematician, best known for his work in algebra (b. 1842)

== May 18, 1913 (Sunday) ==
- A group of 67 opium poppy farmers, who had refused to allow their crops to be burned by Chinese army, were themselves burned to death when they were meeting in Zhengzhou, China to discuss an organized resistance. Chinese troops set fire to the structure and prevented the defiant narcotics manufacturers from escaping.
- The Foon Yew High School opened to students, becoming the largest Chinese independent high school in Malaysia.
- Sports club Djerv was established in Bergen, Norway and has become known for its association football, floorball, badminton, basketball and gymnastics programs.
- Born:
  - Vincent Dole, American physician who pioneered the use of methadone to treat narcotics addiction; in Chicago (d. 2006)
  - Charles Trenet, French singer and songwriter, known for songs including "Boum!", "La Mer", "Que reste-t-il de nos amours?"; as Louis Charles Augustin Georges Trenet, in Narbonne, Aude département (d. 2001)
- Died: Edward Sylvester Nolan, 55, Canadian-born American baseball player, pitcher for various major league teams including the Pittsburgh Alleghenys, died of kidney disease (b. 1857)

== May 19, 1913 (Monday) ==
- Despite protests from Japan and pleas from the White House, California Governor Hiram Johnson signed the Alien Land Law, barring Japanese aliens from owning property. The U.S. Government responded to Japan's protests, disagreeing that the state law violated the American treaties with Japan.
- Born:
  - Neelam Sanjiva Reddy, 6th President of India from 1977 to 1982; in Illur, Madras province, British India (present-day Andhra Pradesh, India) (d. 1996)
  - George S. Schairer, American aircraft engineer, designer for Consolidated Aircraft and Boeing; in Wilkinsburg, Pennsylvania (d. 2004)

== May 20, 1913 (Tuesday) ==
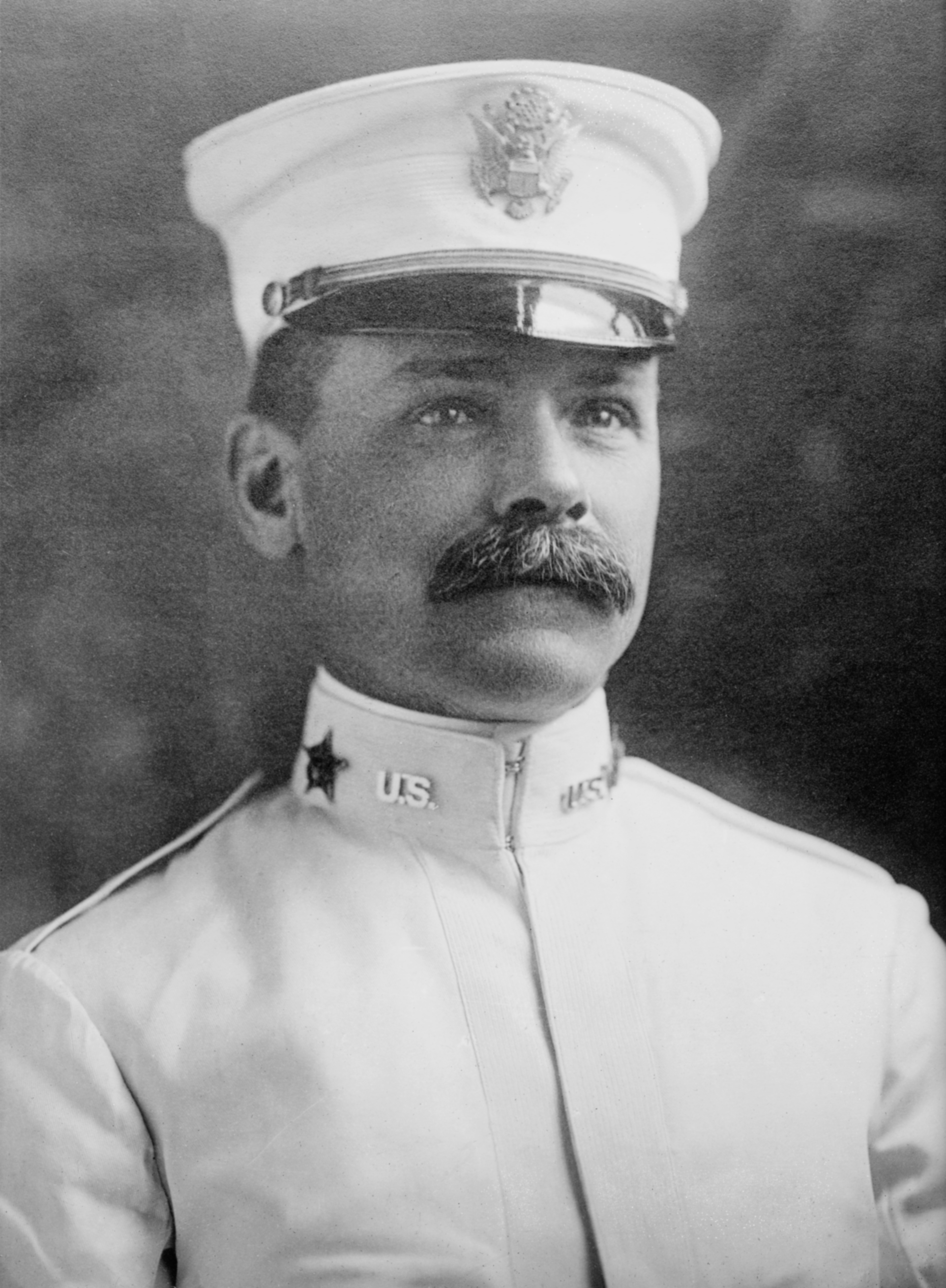
David du Bose Gaillard, engineer for the Panama Canal.

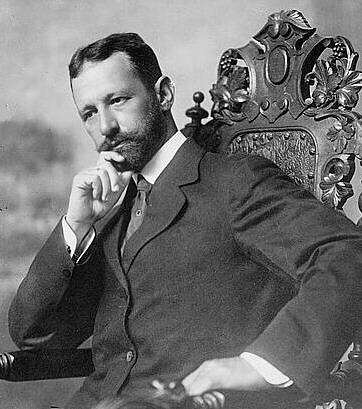
Mario García Menocal, President of Cuba.

- The Venstre Party in Denmark won the most seats in the federal elections even though the Social Democrats received the most votes.
- Mario García Menocal was inaugurated as the third President of Cuba, succeeding José Miguel Gómez. Menocal would be re-elected to a second term in 1916, and serve until 1921.
- In an important development in the building of the Panama Canal, the nearly 8 mile long Culebra Cut was completed as excavation equipment from both sides of mountainous territory met at 4:30 p.m. Engineer David du Bose Gaillard, who had overseen the cut through since work had resumed in 1904, would die in December after years of hard work.
- The U.S. Department of Justice filed an antitrust suit to dissolve the United Shoe Machinery Company.
- U.S. Navy destroyer Cassin was launched by Bath Iron Works in Bath, Maine and would serve in World War I before it was transferred to the United States Coast Guard. It was decommissioned in 1934.
- The French-language newspaper La Liberté began publishing in Saint Boniface, Manitoba as the province's sole francophone newspaper.
- Demand for opera glasses for opera and theatrical productions in London led to the formation of the London Opera Glass Company.
- Born:
  - Bill Hewlett, American business leader, co-founder of Hewlett-Packard; as William Hewlett, in Ann Arbor, Michigan (d. 2001)
  - H. T. Cadbury-Brown, English architect, contributing designer to the Royal College of Art; as Henry Thomas Cadbury-Brown, in Sarratt, Hertfordshire (d. 2009)
- Died: Henry Flagler, 83, American industrialist, co-founder of Standard Oil (b. 1830)

== May 21, 1913 (Wednesday) ==
- United Kingdom's King George was welcomed in Germany by Kaiser Wilhelm, and Tsar Nicholas was welcomed the following day. The monarchs had arrived to attend the wedding of the Kaiser's daughter, Princess Luise. King George was a first cousin of the Kaiser (George's father and Wilhelm's mother were both children of Queen Victoria) and a first cousin to the Tsar (both of their mothers were daughters of King Christian of Denmark).
- The Church of Jesus Christ of Latter-day Saints became the first religious organization to make a commitment to the Boy Scouts of America (BSA), as it merged its Young Men's Mutual Improvement Association Scouts into the BSA organization.

== May 22, 1913 (Thursday) ==
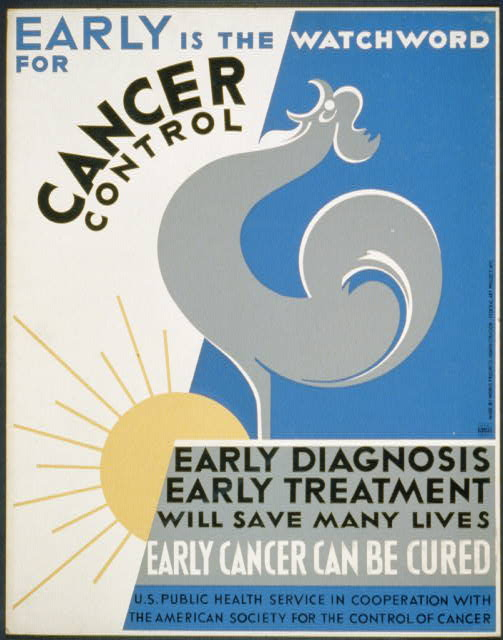
American Society for the Control of Cancer poster from 1938

- Through the efforts of both China's Minister to the New York City police, a truce was negotiated and signed to end gang warfare among the various tongs in New York City. The agreement, between the Chinese Merchants' Association, the On Leong Tong, the Hip Sing Tong and the Kim Lan Wui Saw, and would keep relative peace until 1924.
- Royal Navy submarine AE1 was launched by Vickers Limited in Barrow-in-Furness, England to serve in the Royal Australian Navy at the start of World War I but was lost at sea in 1914.
- The American Cancer Society was founded in by ten doctors and five laymen in Washington, D.C., as the American Society for the Control of Cancer. It would change to its current name in 1946.

== May 23, 1913 (Friday) ==
- Near Buenos Aires, thirty workers were killed and another 51 injured in an explosion at the Argentine hydraulic plant on an island in the Matanza River near its confluence with the Río de la Plata.
- Aboard the U.S. Navy destroyer USS Stewart (DD-13), the bottom of the high pressure cylinder blew out, killing three sailors.
- Died: George A. Irwin, 68, American religious leader, 9th President of the General Conference of Seventh-day Adventists (b. 1844)

== May 24, 1913 (Saturday) ==
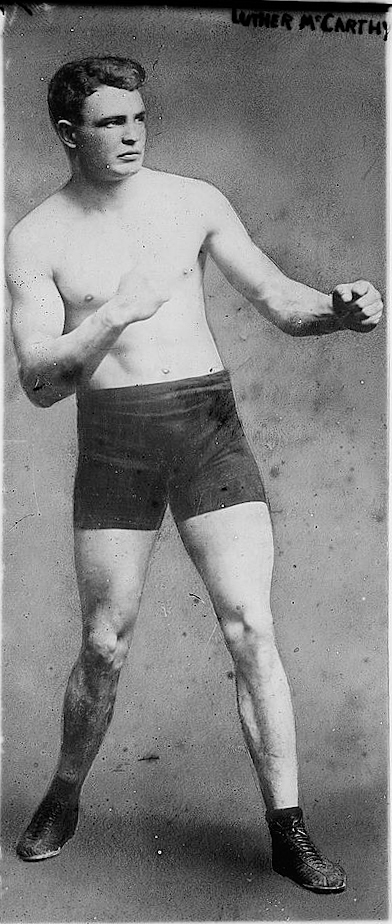
Boxer Luther McCarty

- The collapse of a municipal pier in Long Beach, California, killed 35 women and one man. There were 10,000 people crowded on the double-deck pier when the top level gave way and fell on the persons below.
- The Turkish-American steamship Nevada, with 200 passengers and crew, strayed into a mined part of the harbor at Smyrna while trying to avoid another ship, and struck three mines before sinking. Based on reports of 80 survivors, initial news stories reported 120 people had drowned. The figure was later revised to forty deaths.
- Princess Luise, the only daughter of Kaiser Wilhelm, was married to Prince Ernest Augustus of Cumberland, in the last royal wedding to take place in Germany.
- Luther McCarty, who was recognized as the "white world heavyweight boxing champion" (Jack Johnson was the world champion), died in the first round of a bout in Calgary against Arthur Pelkey. McCarty was killed when Pelkey punched him in the chest, and fell to the mat halfway through the first round. An autopsy later determined that McCarty had died of a broken neck and hemorrhage, as a result of a hit to the jaw 30 seconds earlier that had snapped his head back. Pelkey would be tried for manslaughter, and acquitted on June 24.
- Sports club São José was established in Porto Alegre, Brazil.
- Born: Peter Ellenshaw, British-born American production designer, best known for design work for Walt Disney Studios including Treasure Island and 20,000 Leagues Under the Sea, recipient of the Academy Award for Best Visual Effects for Mary Poppins; as William Samuel Cook Ellenshaw, in London (d. 2007)

== May 25, 1913 (Sunday) ==
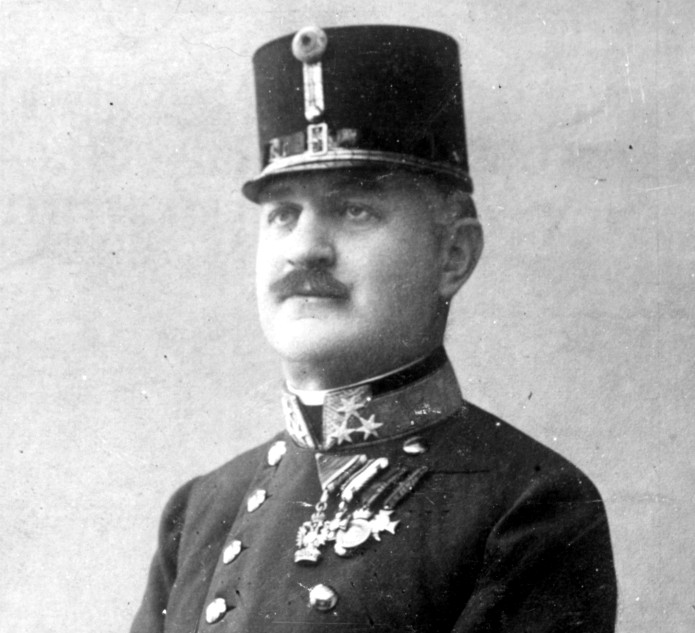
Colonel Alfred Redl of the Austro-Hungarian Army.

- Colonel Alfred Redl, director of intelligence for the Army of Austria-Hungary from 1907 to 1912, committed suicide after being discovered that he had passed secrets to the Russian Empire for eleven years. Redl had betrayed his nation after the Russians had discovered that he was a homosexual and used the information as blackmail. Redl's successor, Captain Maximilian Ronge, agreed to Redl's request for a loaded revolver after confronting him at Vienna's Hotel Klomser.
- Peter Kürten, a German serial killer called "The Vampire of Dusseldorf" by the press, committed his first provable murder, although his killing spree of at least nine people would not start until 1929. Kurten broke into a home and slit the throat of 9-year-old Christine Klein while she was sleeping. Kürten, who would claim that he killed 79 people, would be convicted of nine and would be executed on July 2, 1931.
- Adolf Hitler, an immigrant from Austria-Hungary, took up residence in Germany, a nation that he would eventually rule. The 24-year old painter and his friend, Rudolf Häusler, rented a room at 34 Schleissheimerstrasse in Munich.
- Belgian cyclist Paul Deman won the first Tour of Flanders road cycling race, completing the 324 kilometres (201.3 miles) course from Ghent to Mariakerke, Belgium in a time of 12 hours, 3 minutes, 10 seconds.
- The football club Santa Cruz was established in Santa Cruz, Chile.
- Born:
  - Heinrich Bär, German air force officer, commander of the Jagdgeschwader 51 and other squadrons for the Luftwaffe during World War II, recipient of the Knight's Cross of the Iron Cross; as Oscar-Heinrich Bär, in Sommerfeld, German Empire (present-day Lubsko, Poland) (d. 1957)
  - Brownie Wise, American entrepreneur who developed the party plan marketing strategy for selling Tupperware; as Brownie Humphrey, in Buford, Georgia (d. 1992)

== May 26, 1913 (Monday) ==
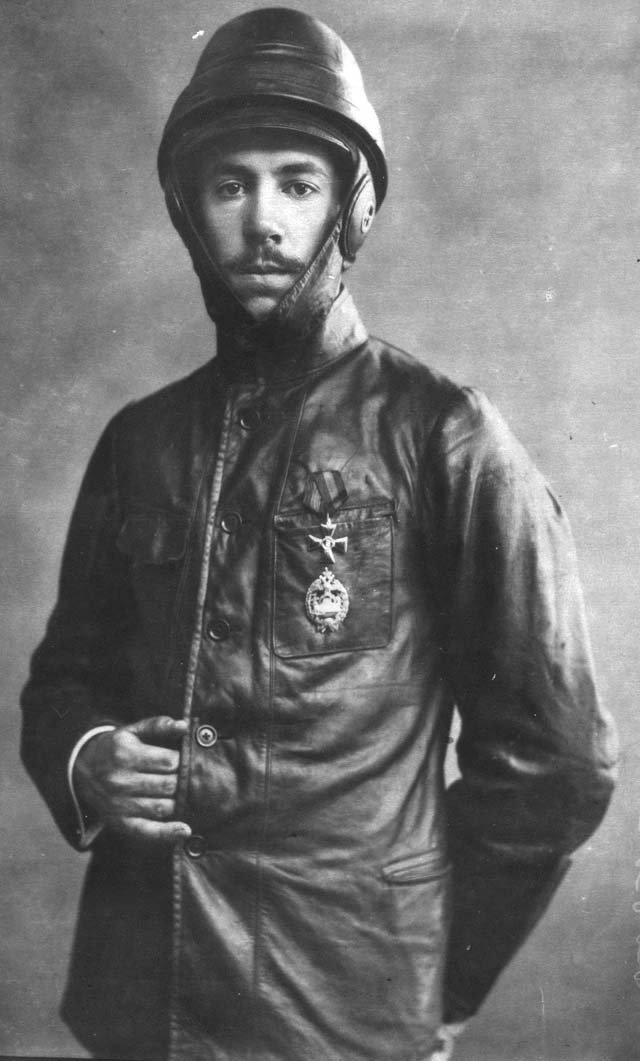
Igor Sikorsky

- Igor Sikorsky became the first person to pilot a four-engine airplane as he took his Bolshoi Baltisky biplane Ilya Mourometz into the sky for the Imperial Russian Air Service near Saint Petersburg. Powered by 220 horsepower engines, the bomber could carry up to 1,543 pounds of bombs and had room for four machine guns and a crew of five. It was also the first plane fitted with a lavatory.
- The Actors' Equity Association was incorporated as a labor union for stage actors.
- The financial plan of France's Prime Minister Louis Barthou was upheld by the Chamber of Deputies 312–240.
- Born: Peter Cushing, English actor, best known for his work with in the Frankenstein and Dracula horror films for Hammer Film Productions and Grand Moff Tarkin in Star Wars; in Kenley, Surrey (d. 1994)

== May 27, 1913 (Tuesday) ==
- At Ishpeming, Michigan, former U.S. President Theodore Roosevelt testified in the trial of his libel suit against the magazine Iron Ore and its editor, George A. Newett, over an article accusing Roosevelt of drunkenness.
- Norwegian destroyer Garm was launched by the Royal Norwegian Navy at Horten, Norway. Despite being decommissioned in the late 1930s, she was put back into action for the Norwegian campaign during World War II.
- Painter Ernst Ludwig Kirchner formally announced the German artistic group Die Brücke had dissolved.
- The football club Hobro was established in Hobro, Denmark.
- Born: Henry Swan II, American surgeon who pioneered the use of hypothermia-cooling open heart surgery and performed the first aortic aneurysmectomy; in Denver (d. 1996)

== May 28, 1913 (Wednesday) ==
- Democrats in the U.S. Senate followed the example of the U.S. House of Representatives and created the office of "party whip", a person whose job it was to enforce the presence of the party's senators at decisive votes. Senator J. Hamilton Lewis of Illinois was selected as the first person for the job.
- Died: John Lubbock, 79, British archaeologist who coined the terms Paleolithic and Neolithic to describe the prehistoric eras of humans (b. 1834)

== May 29, 1913 (Thursday) ==
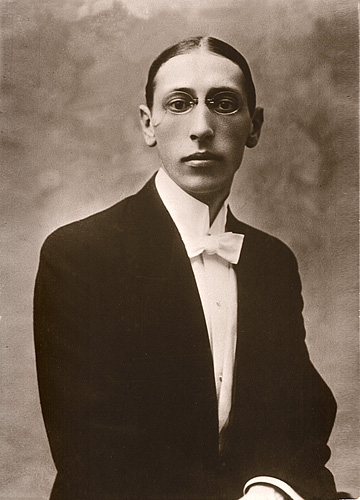
Composer Igor Stravinsky

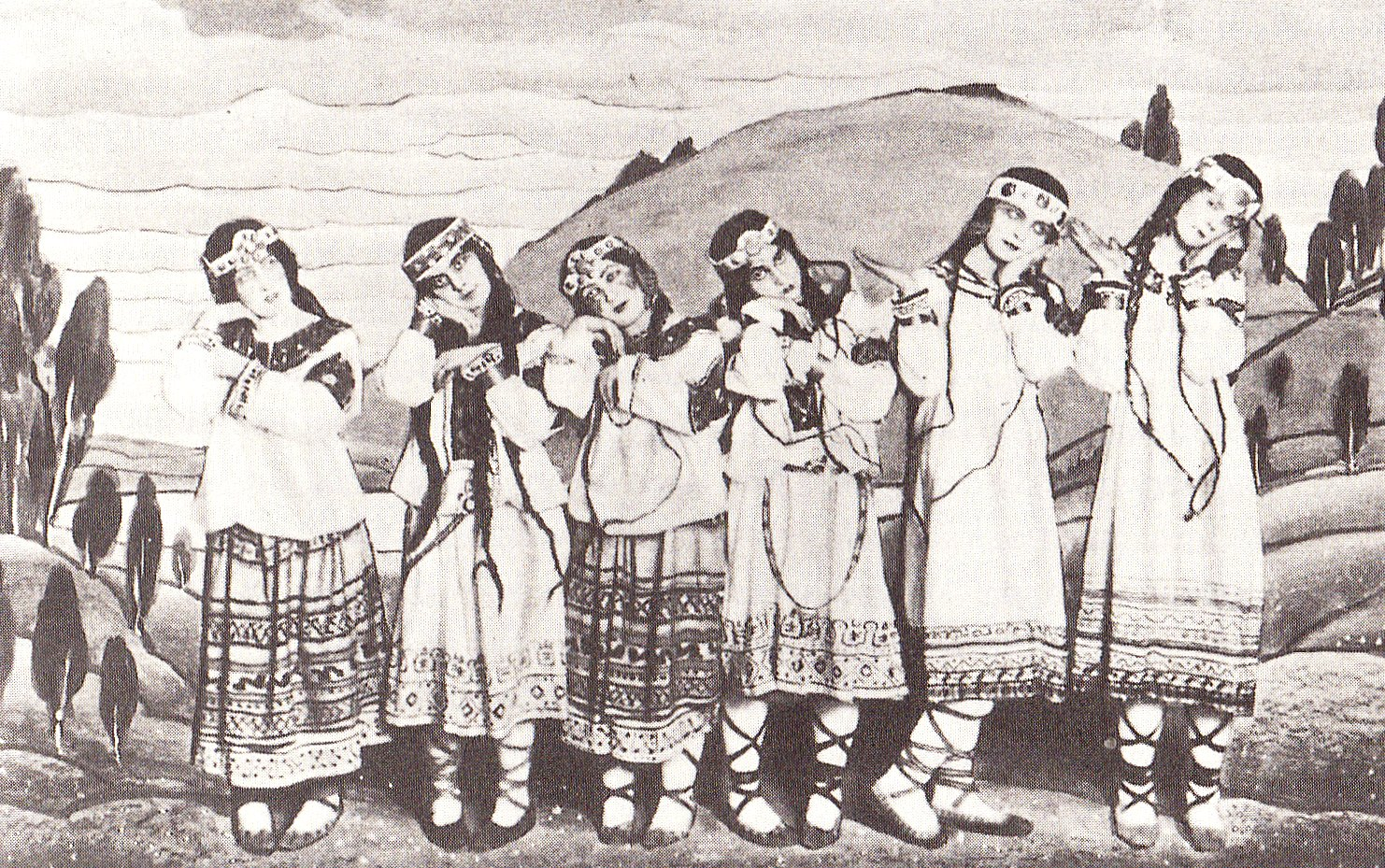
The original dancers for The Rite of Spring

- The ballet The Rite of Spring (Le Sacre du Printemps), with music by Igor Stravinsky conducted by Pierre Monteux, choreography by Vaslav Nijinsky and design by Nicholas Roerich, premièred by Sergei Diaghilev's Ballets Russes at the Théâtre des Champs-Élysées in Paris; its modernism provoked one of the most famous classical music riots in history.
- The Democratic, Republican and Unity political parties merged to form the Progressive Party in the Republic of China.
- The Ausserfern Railway opened in Tyrol, Austria as a cross-border rail line between Kempten, Germany and Reutte, Austria and the only link into the Außerfern region.
- The Astor House, the first luxury hotel to open in New York City in 1836, closed after decades of operation. The hotel, located at Broadway and Vesey Street, had hosted 19 future, present, and former U.S. Presidents, from Andrew Jackson to Theodore Roosevelt, with the exception of Andrew Johnson.
- The town of Zap, North Dakota was founded in Mercer County. On May 9, 1969, the town would attract more than 2,000 college students in a civil disorder that would become known as "The Zip to Zap".
- Born: Tony Zale, American boxer, World Middleweight Champion in 1941 and 1946 to 1948; as Anthony Zaleski, in Gary, Indiana (d. 1997)

== May 30, 1913 (Friday) ==
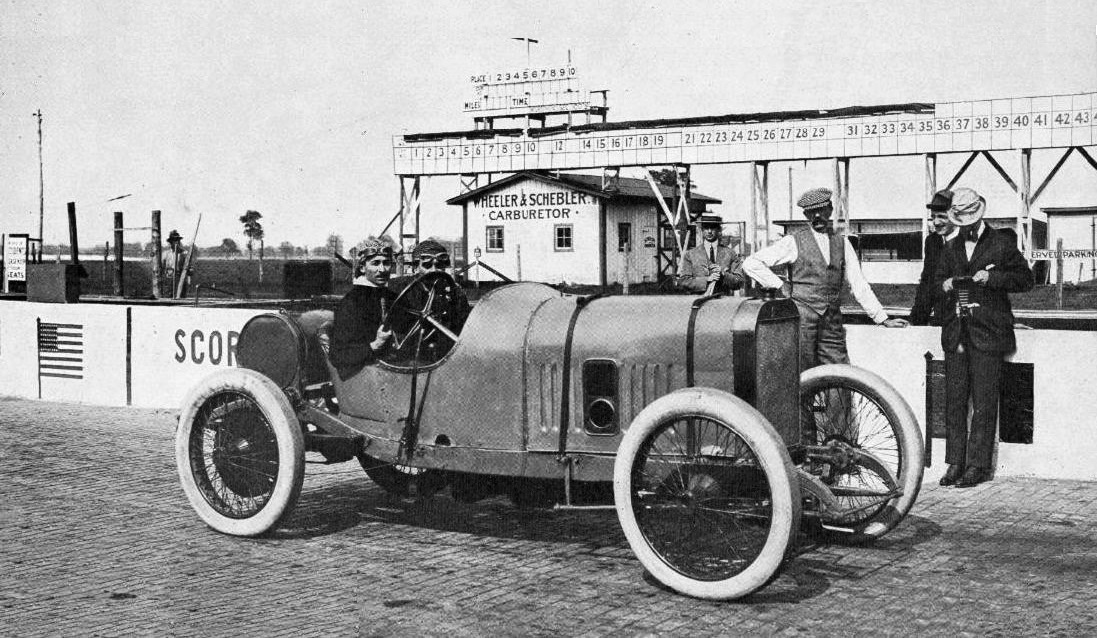
Indy 500 winner Jules Goux

- The First Balkan War formally ended with the signing of the Treaty of London between the Ottoman Empire and the Balkan League (Bulgaria, Greece, Serbia and Montenegro). The Ottoman Turks ceded almost all of their European territories to the Balkan nations.
- U.S. Secretary of State William Jennings Bryan announced that the United Kingdom, France, Russia, Italy, Norway, Sweden, Brazil and Peru had responded favorably to Bryan's proposal for an international peace commission.
- The Apostolic Prefecture of Bahr el-Ghazal was established in Sudan, later becoming the Roman Catholic Diocese of Wau in 1974.
- Jules Goux won the third Indianapolis 500, driving a Peugeot. Averaging 76.59 miles per hour, Goux finished the race in 6 hours, 31 minutes and 33.45 seconds and won a $20,000 prize. The race continued for another hour and 18 minutes until the tenth and last racer had completed the 500 miles.

== May 31, 1913 (Saturday) ==
- In Australia's House of Representatives elections, the Commonwealth Liberal Party led by Joseph Cook, won control of the 75-member lower house by a single seat, with a 38–37 advantage over the Australian Labor Party led by Prime Minister Andrew Fisher. Overall, the Liberals had 930,076 votes to the 921,099 for the ALP. As well, six questions were held for referendum ranging from trade and commerce to railway disputes, with all six not being carried.
- The Seventeenth Amendment to the United States Constitution, providing for popular vote to elect U.S. senators, was proclaimed in effect by Secretary of State Bryan, who signed the announcement at 11:00 am in Washington, D.C.
- Romania's Chamber of Deputies voted in favor of letting Russia mediate in its dispute with Bulgaria.
- Theodore Roosevelt's lawsuit for libel came to an end with the Iron Ore publishing a retraction and an admission from the editor that nobody had substantiated claims that Roosevelt "drank to excess."
- King Carol officially inaugurated the Carol I Mosque (today known as the Grand Mosque of Constanța) in Constanța, Romania, with Sultan Mehmed in attendance.
- The Marselisborg Hospital was inaugurated in Aarhus, Denmark.
- Died: Frederick A. Ober, 64, American naturalist, leading expert on early Central American indigenous history (b. 1849)
