= Delray Beach Public Library =

Library in Delray Beach, Florida

- 26.46129°N 80.07459°W
- Location: Delray Beach, Florida
- Type: Public Library
- Established: 1913

Other information
- Director: Executive Director, Mykal Banta
- Website: Official site

The Delray Beach Public Library is an independent, not-for-profit 501(c)3 library located in Delray Beach, FL in Palm Beach County, FL. The library is funded through public and private partnerships and is not a part of government.

== History ==
On April 11, 1913, 40 women from the Ladies Improvement Association of Delray Beach met and each donated one book to start a library in Delray Beach, FL. In 1916, the library was moved to the Booster Hall and received a ten dollar gift from Henry Flagler to support the library. In 1939, the Delray Beach Public Library officially became a not-for-profit corporation, a 501(c)3 library. This year also saw the Library Association become official incorporated, in order to manage library operations and set consistent evening hours, among other item loan standards, such as a 25 cent fee for taking out best sellers and no fee for taking out children items. Other notable statistics from this year include that there were 328 borrowers registered with the library and 605 items in circulation.

In 1940, the Delray Beach Public Library Association cultivated a public private partnership between the City of Delray Beach and the Community Redevelopment Agency (CRA). In 1942, this partnership resulted in the first grant the City gave to the Delray Beach Public Library of $800. In 1950, after community fund-raising amounting $14,000, the library was moved to SE 4th Avenue with 15,528 books in circulation. Other developments, including continuously increasing collections, the addition of a Garden Room in 1975 at the SE 4th Avenue location to better house special collections, and other such renovations from the 1960s through the 1990s saw the library continue to grow and develop. In 1994, the library developed and implemented their volunteer program, beginning with 8 volunteers and reach 90 active volunteers by 2007. In 2003, the library reached a tripartate agreement with bott he City of Delray Beach and the Delray Beach Community Redevelopment Agency, as a renewal of the 1940 agreement. In 2006, the Delray Beach Public Library was moved to its current location at 100 W. Atlantic Avenue, the move celebrated with a Book Passing Brigade and ribbon cutting ceremony. Between April 11, 2012 and April 11, 2013, the city of Delray Beach celebrated their 100th year of service, with April 11, 2012 hosting a Banner Ribbon Cutting Ceremony. The Library's current mission statement, as it has evolved from 1913, states that "We ignite curiosity, fuel discover, and encourage creativity through access to trusted information, resources, and community connections."

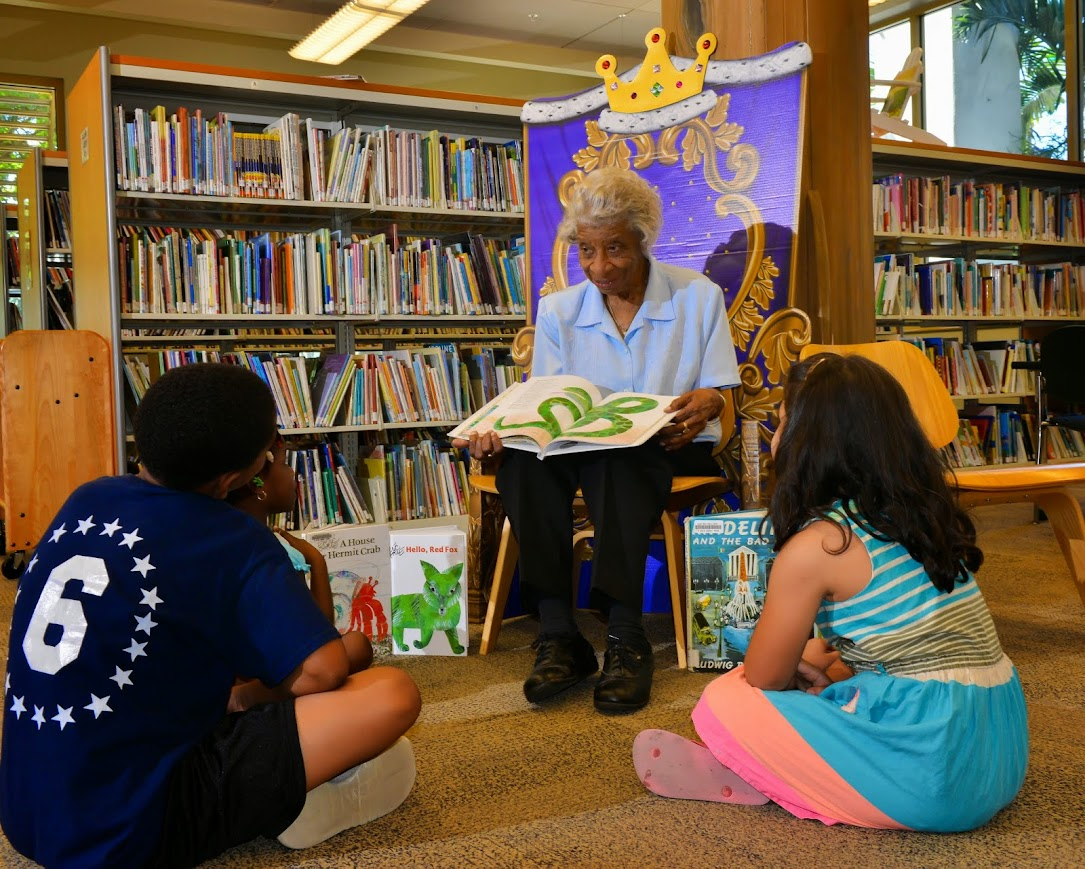
Dr. Henrietta M. Smith at Delray Beach Public Library in 2014.

== Facilities ==
At 46,826 square feet and two stories, the current library building is twice the size of the original. The first floor houses new materials, self-checkout machines, audiovisuals, periodicals, the circulation desk, and the children's department. The meeting rooms, also on the first floor, seat up to 200 people. The Lynda Hunter and Virginia Kimmel children's library also features an audio recording studio and a technology lab with 3D printers. The second floor has a computer training technology lab, 40 PCs for public use, a personal charging station, the Tower Conference Room, the Young adult room, quiet study rooms, and the Reference department. The young adult and adult non-fiction, reference, biography, and older fiction collections can be found on the second floor as well. Wi-Fi is available to the public throughout the library.

== Services ==
Current residents in the state of Florida can receive a free library card. The Delray Beach Public library has over 2,000 visitors per day. The Delray Beach Public Library provides free information and resources which include printed books for all ages, audio books, large print books, magazines, foreign language materials, music CDs, videos, DVDs, as well as free access to the Internet, electronic databases, proctoring services, art exhibits, concerts, a Lifelong Learning Community Institute, computer instruction, homework help, and job search assistance.

The library also offers services that cater to different age groups. It provides library story times that encourage early literacy in children and offers special after school programs and STEM classes that are centered on a child's interests. Teenagers have the option to take advantage of the volunteer opportunities the library has to offer throughout the year where they can earn community service hours, skill enhancement, and career readiness. The Summer Leadership Academy is among the skill enhancement programs that help teens develop fundamental characteristics in leadership. The seven-week program highlights a targeted characteristic from a selected collection of books. Teens can also use Brainfuse in order to receive live tutoring and test prep information. The library supplies adults with volunteer opportunities as well, and provides opportunities for lifelong learning, community connections, and civil discourse. The library regularly hosts special events and programs for adults, which include yoga, Socrates Café, and adult coloring club.

In addition to in person, online, email and telephone assistance, library members can also Book-A-Librarian to get one-on-one research assistance.

The Information Services Department is equipped to proctor print or online examinations, based on availability, for distance learners.

The library's Interlibrary Loan service offers library members access to materials from other libraries if they are interested in an item the library does not own.

== Collection ==
The Delray Beach Public Library's collection comprises a variety of physical and digital resources that are accessible with a library card. Any person residing in Florida can get a card from Delray Beach Library at no charge - with a photo ID or a license. New patrons under the age of 14 must register with a parent or legal guardian to obtain a card.

The first floor of the library is home to the Lynda Hunter and Virginia Kimmel Children's Library. Open to the public since 2016, the children's library's vibrant, storybook-Esque space contains a 40,000+ collection of fiction and nonfiction books. Board books for babies, picture books for primary grades, chapter books series for intermediate grades, and tween graphic novels are among the rich assortment of books for young readers and families. Children's eBooks, audiobooks, movies, music, and comics are directly accessible with a Delray Beach library card through Hoopla, CloudLibrary, and Overdrive.

The young adult collection for ages 13 to 17 is located on the second floor of the library. The low shelves hold the general collection of 20,000 young adult novels which are a variety of thrillers, romance, contemporary, fantasy and science fiction books. The library's special collection of manga and graphic novels is designated in the Young Adult room, where patrons between the ages of 13 and 17 can comfortably study and utilize computers for research or leisure. Like in Children's, young adult eBooks, audiobooks, movies, music, and comics are directly accessible with a Delray Beach library card through Hoopla, CloudLibrary, and Overdrive.

Sharing the same floor with young adults, the books for adult readers are specifically organized by the Dewy Decimal System for nonfiction titles and the author's last name for fiction and biography. The extensive special collection of mystery fiction has classic to the modern and in-demand titles of the year. Other popular and new book titles are also present on the first floor along with large print books. Digital collections for adults are available through Hoopla, CloudLibrary, and Overdrive. Moreover, there are 98,000+ books are available for adult readers.

== Annual events ==
- Laugh with the Library, an annual comedy benefit
- Delray Reads Day, an annual community-wide reading project

== Awards ==
- Greater Delray Beach Chamber Of Commerce - Luminary Gala Award, Non-Profit Organization of the Year 2011-2012
- Community Foundation of Palm Beach and Martin Counties-Forever Endowment Challenge (2017)
