= January 1913 =

Month of 1913

<<	January 1913					>>
Su	Mo	Tu	We	Th	Fr	Sa
			1	2	3	4
5	6	7	8	9	10	11
12	13	14	15	16	17	18
19	20	21	22	23	24	25
26	27	28	29	30	31

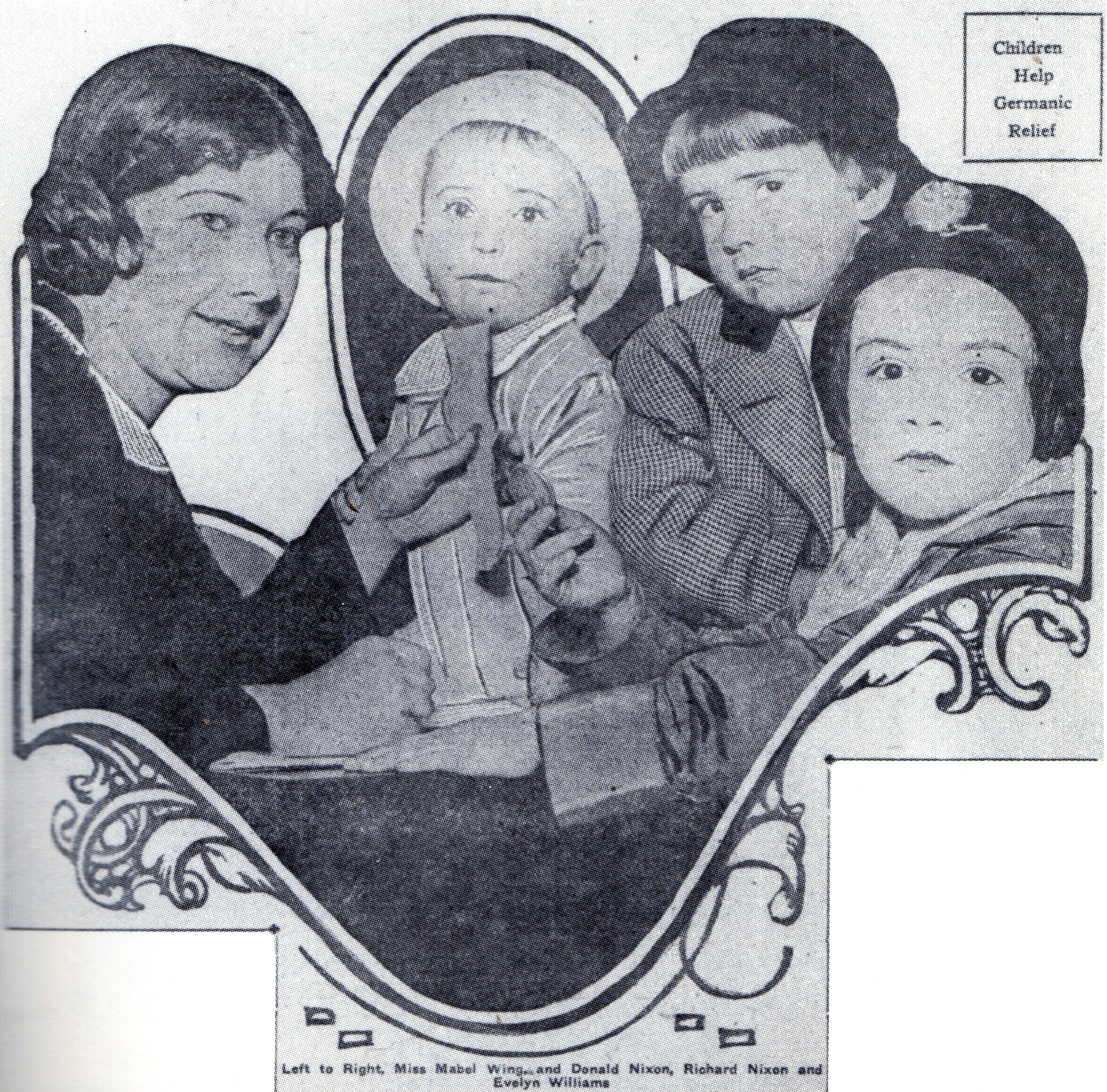
January 9, 1913: Future U.S. President Richard Nixon (2nd from right) born in California

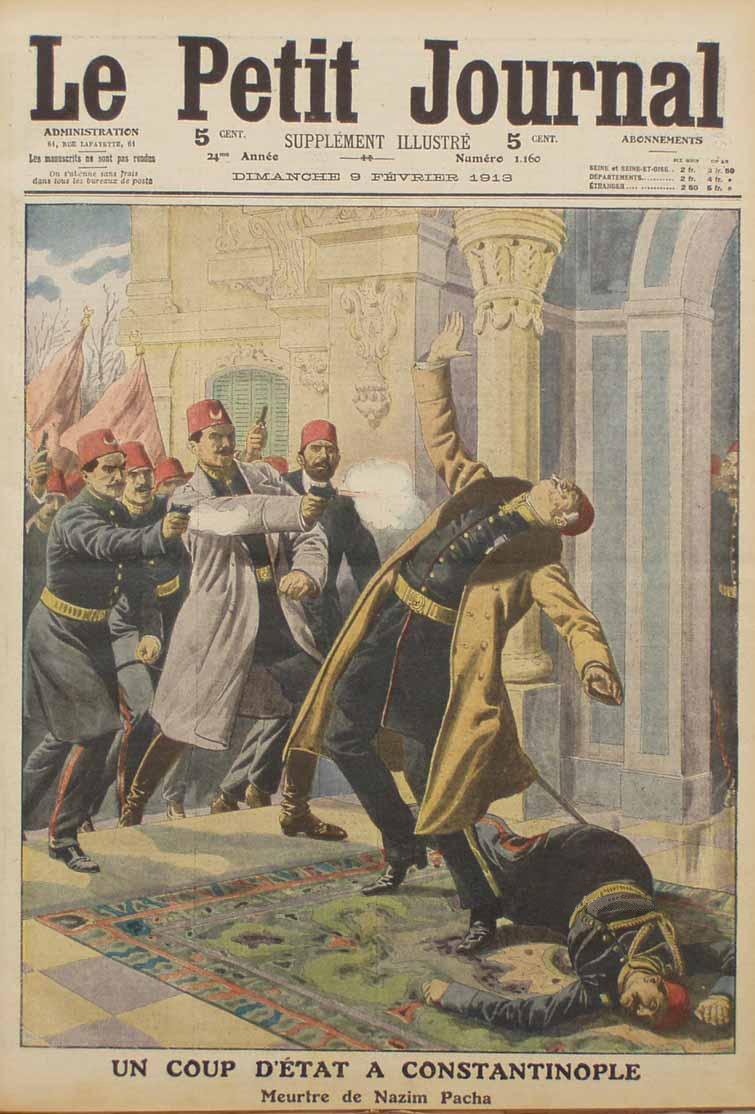
January 23, 1913: Ottoman Empire Navy Minister Nazim assassinated, Prime Minister Kamil overthrown in coup in Turkey

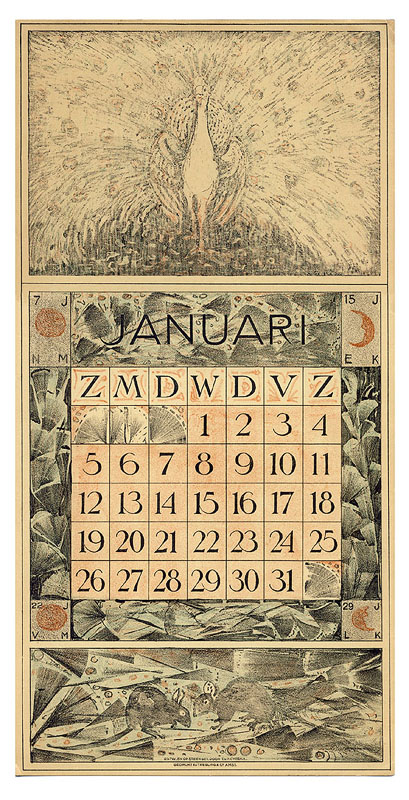
Dutch calendar for January 1913, designed by Theo van Hoytema

The following events occurred in January 1913:

== January 1, 1913 (Wednesday) ==
- The "Six Powers" (the United States, United Kingdom, France, Russia, Germany and Japan) agreed to a $125,000,000 loan to China at 6 percent interest.
- The Council of the Russian Empire adopted a law freeing the last of the Russian serfs. In 1861, the Caucasus had been exempt from the emancipation of serfs there.
- Parcel post was inaugurated in the United States.
- Horatio Clarence Hocken was elected 36th Mayor of Toronto in the municipal election, his first full term after serving as interim mayor following the resignation of George Reginald Geary in 1912.
- The German National Library was established in Leipzig.
- Louis Armstrong, as an 11-year-old boy in New Orleans, was arrested by police after firing his stepfather's pistol to celebrate the arrival of the new year. He was sentenced by the juvenile court to 18 months at the Colored Waifs' Home, where his musical talent would be perfected, and he would go on to fame as one of America's greatest jazz artists.
- The British Board of Censors began operations.
- Kvenvær Municipality and Otterøy Municipality were established in Norway. Both were dissolved in 1964.
- The municipality of Churchbridge, Saskatchewan was established.
- Born: Shih Kien, Chinese actor, known for his villainous roles in martial arts and wuxia films including Enter the Dragon; as Shek Wing-cheung, in Shigang Village, Guangzhou province, Republic of China (d. 2009)

== January 2, 1913 (Thursday) ==
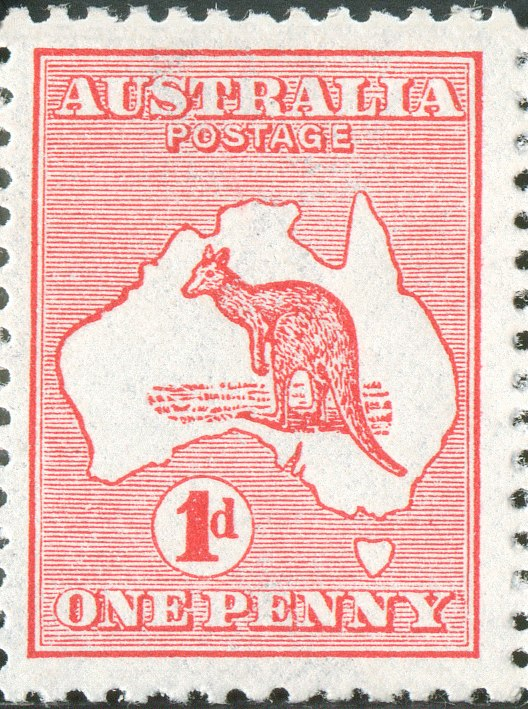
Australia's Kangaroo and Map stamp series

- U.S. Representative William Wedemeyer of Michigan jumped overboard from the ocean liner Panama while returning to the United States, in an apparent suicide. Wedemeyer, who had been defeated in November 1912 in his bid for reelection, had accompanied U.S. President William Howard Taft in December on a visit to Panama as part of a 30-member congressional inspection party and was treated for depression in a Canal Zone hospital before sailing for home.
- Australia initiated its own postage service with the Kangaroo and Map stamp series, which featured a kangaroo standing on a map of Australia.
- The comic strip Bringing Up Father began an 87-year run. Created by George McManus, the strip about an Irish millionaire and his wife (Jiggs and Maggie) was a daily; it became a Sunday feature beginning April 14, 1918. After McManus died in 1954, the strip continued until May 28, 2000.
- Yiddish-language weekly newspaper, The Time, began publication in Saint Petersburg. It would be shut down by the government on the eve of World War I.
- Born: Anna Lee, English-born American film actress, best known for How Green Was My Valley, Two Rode Together and Fort Apache, and in the television soap opera General Hospital; as Joan Boniface Winnifrith, in Ightham, Kent (d. 2004)
- Died: Léon Teisserenc de Bort, 57, French meteorologist, credited for identifying the stratosphere (b. 1855)

== January 3, 1913 (Friday) ==
- A coastal storm lashed the eastern coast of the United States, resulting in record low pressures and destructive winds in Pennsylvania, Virginia, New Jersey, New York, Massachusetts, and Maine. Among the ships sunk in the gale were the passenger cargo ship El Dorado with 39 people and 13 people on the liner Julia Luckenbach which had collided with a British ship, Indrakuala, in a fog. Another seven died in the wreck of the American schooner Future.
- Greece completed its capture of the eastern Aegean island of Chios, as the last Ottoman forces on the island surrendered.
- Duarte Leite resigned as the 58th Prime Minister of Portugal.
- The steamer Julia Luckenbach sank after a collision with the British steamer Indrakuala in Chesapeake Bay, killing 15 of the 23 people on board.
- U.S. Senator Joseph Weldon Bailey of Texas resigned with less than two months left in his term; he was replaced by Rienzi Melville Johnston.
- A fire destroyed the famed U.S. Navy sloop-of-war USS Jamestown at Norfolk Naval Shipyard in Portsmouth, Virginia.
- Thomas Edison gave the first demonstration of his new invention, the kinetophone, at his laboratory in West Orange, New Jersey, described as "a combination of the moving picture machine and the phonograph, with a synchronizing device that is a marvel of mechanical ingenuity."
- Died: Jeff Davis, 50, American politician, incumbent U.S. Senator for Arkansas since 1907 and Governor of Arkansas from 1901 to 1907, died of a stroke (b. 1862)

== January 4, 1913 (Saturday) ==
- Rienzi Melville Johnston was appointed as U.S. Senator from Texas to serve the remaining two months of the term for Joseph Weldon Bailey. The Texas Legislature did not approve of the appointment of Johnston by Texas Governor Oscar Branch Colquitt and selected Morris Sheppard to replace him. His 29-day term was the second shortest in Senate's history, behind John N. Heiskell who served 24 days as U.S. Senator from Arkansas.
- Australasian Films merged with the General Film Company of Australasia to form The Combine, the precursor to Event Cinemas in Australia.
- Born: Malietoa Tanumafili II, Samoan state leader, Paramount Chief of Samoa from 1962 to 2007; at Apia, German Samoa (d. 2007)
- Died: Alfred von Schlieffen, 79, German noble and army officer, Chief of the German General Staff of the Imperial German Army from 1891 to 1906, architect of the Schlieffen Plan used in the opening months of World War I (b. 1833)

== January 5, 1913 (Sunday) ==
- Gottlieb von Jagow was named as the new State Secretary of the German Foreign Office.
- Died: Lewis A. Swift, 92, American astronomer who discovered 13 comets and over 1,200 nebulae, second only to German astronomer William Herschel (b. 1820)

== January 6, 1913 (Monday) ==
- The explosion of a boiler on the French battleship Massena killed eight members of the crew.
- Great Southern Railway completed the Ongerup branch railway, connecting Tambellup to Ongerup, Australia.
- Born:
  - Edward Gierek, Polish Communist politician, First Secretary of the Polish United Workers' Party and de facto leader from 1970 to 1980; in Porąbka, Congress Poland, Russian Empire (d. 2001)
  - Loretta Young, American actress, known for her film roles in The Bishop's Wife and Come to the Stable, and her 1950s television series The Loretta Young Show, recipient of the Academy Award for Best Actress for The Farmer's Daughter; as Gretchen Young, in Salt Lake City, Utah (d. 2000)

== January 7, 1913 (Tuesday) ==
- The American steamship Rosecrans was wrecked in a gale and ran aground on Peacock Spit, a spit off the coast of Oregon, killing 33 of the crew of 36.
- The Canadian steamship Cheslakee capsized in the Strait of Georgia near Van Anda, British Columbia, killing seven people on board. It was salvaged on January 20 to examine why it capsized before it was re-commissioned into service.
- William Merriam Burton was awarded U.S. Patent No. 1,049,667 for his thermal cracking process, that would dramatically increase the supply of gasoline that could be developed from crude oil.
- Born: Shirley Ross, American actress and singer known for her musical roles in Manhattan Melodrama and The Big Broadcast of 1938; as Bernice Gaunt, in Omaha, Nebraska (d. 1975)

== January 8, 1913 (Wednesday) ==
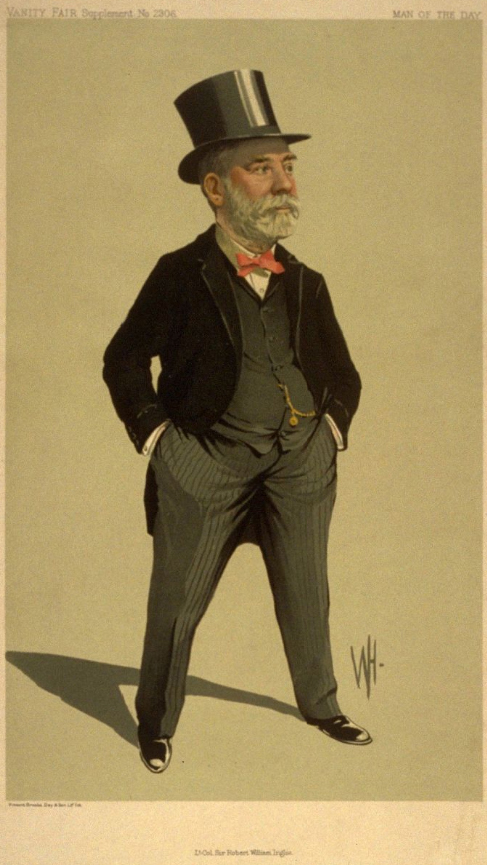
Caricature of Lt-Colonel Sir Robert William Inglis, published in Vanity Fair, January 8, 1913, as "Men of the Day" Number 2306

- Serbia gave up its demand for a port on the Adriatic Sea as part of its negotiation at the London Peace Conference to end the Balkan Wars.
- Afonso Costa became the 13th Prime Minister of Portugal.
- Alfred Deakin resigned as Leader of the Opposition in Australia.
- Swiss polar explorer Xavier Mertz, the second member of the Far Eastern Party for the Australasian Antarctic Expedition, died after going in a coma brought on by medical experts later believed to be hypervitaminosis A due to eating dog liver when food rations were low, leaving party leader Douglas Mawson the sole survivor of the expedition team. Belgrave Edward Sutton Ninnis, the third member of the party, died after he fell into a crevasse while the team crossed a glacier on December 14, 1912.
- English poet Harold Monro founded the Poetry Bookshop in London, where it became a significant literary meeting place.
- The Hotel McAlpin, largest in New York City, opened with rooms for 2,500 guests. An unusual feature of the 25-story hotel was that was one floor was reserved exclusively for men, another for women, and the "sleepy sixteenth" floor was to be kept "quiet as a tomb" during the daytime.
- Sports club BUL was established in Oslo and has become known for its leading track and field and skiing programs in Norway.

== January 9, 1913 (Thursday) ==
- The passenger cargo ship SS Rosecrans broke in two after crashing during a storm against rocks off of the coast of the U.S. state of Washington. Two members of the crew survived and another 35 drowned in the storm.
- Born:
  - Richard Nixon, 37th president of the United States from 1969 to 1974, only U.S. president to resign from office; in Yorba Linda, California (d. 1994)
  - Eric Berry, British actor, best for his stage roles in The Boy Friend and films such as The Red Shoes; in London] (d. 1993)

== January 10, 1913 (Friday) ==
- Moroccan rebels, under the command of Ahmed al-Hiba ambushed and killed a Mauritanian detachment of the French camel cavalry, the méhariste corps.
- Romania demanded that Bulgaria cede all territory between the town of Silistra and the Black Sea at the London Peace Conference.
- The explosion of a boiler on the riverboat James T. Staples killed 26 people and injured 21 others.
- Excavating in Egypt near Giza, German architect Hermann Junker and his colleagues from the Austrian Academy of Sciences discovered the Mastaba of Kaninisut, the tomb (mastaba) of Ka-ni-nisut, a high state official in Egypt during the 25th century BC. Over the next 12 years, the burial chamber and its ornate carved walls were dismantled and shipped to the Kunsthistorisches Museum in Vienna, where they were reassembled, opening to the public on June 17, 1925.
- The city of Muñoz, Nueva Ecija, Philippines was established.
- Born:
  - Gustáv Husák, Slovak state leader, President of Czechoslovakia from 1975 to 1989 and General Secretary of the Czechoslovak Communist Party from 1969 to 1987; in Pozsonyhidegkút, Austria-Hungary (now Bratislava-Dúbravka, Slovakia) (d. 1991)
  - Mehmet Shehu, Albanian state leader, Prime Minister of Albania from 1954 to 1981; in Çorrush, Albania (d. committed suicide, 1981)
  - Franco Bordoni, Italian air force officer and race car driver, member of the Corpo Aereo Italiano during World War II, recipient of the Silver Medal of Military Valor and War Merit Cross; as Franco Bordoni-Bisleri, in Milan, Kingdom of Italy] (d. killed in plane crash, 1975)

== January 11, 1913 (Saturday) ==
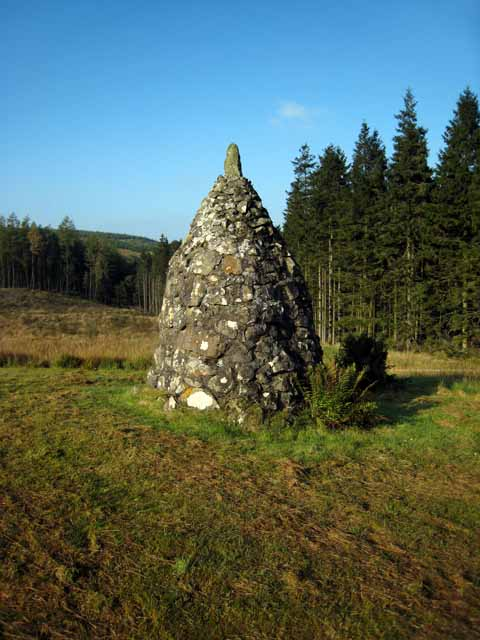
Kirstie's Cairn, Changue Forest The memorial reads "In memory of Christopher McTaggart, shepherd, who perished in snow storm near this spot, 11 January 1913, aged 19 years." The copyright on this image is owned by Oliver Dixon and is licensed for reuse under the Creative Commons Attribution-ShareAlike 2.0 license.

- Having recently proclaimed their independence from China, Tibet and Mongolia signed a mutual defense treaty that, under its terms, was "for all time."
- The Paris intra-urban transit system went entirely to electric streetcars, as the last horse-drawn streetcar made its final run on the city's rails.
- The county clerk for Ottawa County, Kansas, was accidentally locked inside the vault at the courthouse, and nobody in the office knew the combination except for him. Fortunately, former clerk John Bell, living in Salina, remembered the combination "after spending an hour searching his memory for the correct numerals." After 2 1/2 hours, when the vault was opened, "the liberated Baldwin fell to the floor unconscious" from lack of oxygen but survived.
- Born: Lona Cohen, American spy, who worked with husband Morris Cohen to share secrets of the Manhattan Project to the Soviet Union; as Leontine Theresa Petka, in Adams, Massachusetts (d. 1992)

== January 12, 1913 (Sunday) ==
- Alexandre Millerand quit as Minister of War for the French government after Lieutenant Colonel Armand du Paty de Clam, a key figure in the Dreyfus affair, was reinstated.
- In an article for the Russian-language Paris newspaper Sozial Demokrat, Bolshevik activist Josef Dzhugashvili first used the pseudonym based on the Russian word for steel "Stal" (Стал). The issue was dated January 12 because of the differences between the Julian calendar used in Russia at the time, and the Gregorian calendar that would be adopted later. "The National Question and Social Democracy" was signed with the name "K. Stalin", a "steel man", a name that Joseph Stalin would use thereafter.
- German archaeologist Hermann Junker discovered Mastaba of Kaninisut, an ancient Egyptian tomb, during excavation of the field west of the Great Pyramid of Giza.
- The Castle Point Lighthouse was officially lit at Castlepoint, New Zealand.

== January 13, 1913 (Monday) ==
- U.S. Commerce Court judge Robert W. Archbald was convicted on five of 13 articles of impeachment by the United States Senate and removed from office. The vote was 68–5 on the first article, sufficient for removal. In all, he was convicted on three articles, acquitted on the other ten. He became only the third U.S. government official to be removed by the impeachment process.
- Electors in the 48 United States, chosen in the presidential election in November, met in their respective state legislatures to cast their electoral votes. Woodrow Wilson received 435 votes from 40 states, Theodore Roosevelt 88 from six states, and incumbent U.S. President William Howard Taft favored only by Utah and Vermont, won eight votes.
- The Ulster Volunteer Force was organized by Edward Carson and James Craig to resist the Irish Home Rule movement.
- The first attempt at airmail delivery in the United States began as aviator Harry M. Jones took off from Franklin Park in Boston with a pouch of mail bound for several destinations en route to New York City. Jones landed in Providence, Rhode Island 64 minutes later and collected more mail bound for New York. Plagued by frequent breakdowns and bad weather, Jones's 215 miles (346 km) flight would not be completed until 46 days later, on March 10.
- Railroad executive Julius Kruttschnitt left Union Pacific Railroad and succeeded Robert S. Lovett as Chairman of the Executive Committee for the Southern Pacific Railroad.
- Delta Sigma Theta, an African-American sorority, was founded at Howard University. A century later, it would have 900 chapters in eight nations.
- The Harvard University Press was established at a meeting of the president and fellows of the university.
- The Nacional was established in Manaus, Brazil and is the oldest association football club in Amazonas.
- Born:
  - Murray Bowen, American psychiatrist, pioneer in systemic family therapy; in Waverly, Tennessee (d. 1990)
  - Dox, Malagasy poet and promoter of romanticism in Madagascar; as Jean Verdi Salomon Razakandrainy, in Manankavaly, French Madagascar (d. 1978)

== January 14, 1913 (Tuesday) ==
- The London Peace Conference ended as the Balkan states and the Ottoman Empire were unable to reach an agreement in negotiations.
- The football club Zbrojovka Brno was established in Brno, Moravia, Austria-Hungary (now the Czech Republic).
- Born: Luderin Darbone, American Cajun musician, fiddler for the Hackberry Ramblers; in Evangeline Parish, Louisiana (d. 2008)

== January 15, 1913 (Wednesday) ==
- In a battle in the First Balkan War, the Ottoman battle cruiser Medjidie attacked and sank the Greek merchant ship Macedonia, which had been armed for use as a troop transport.
- The members of Britain's Royal Geographical Society voted overwhelmingly to admit women, after 82 years as an all-male organization.
- The first sickness benefits were paid under the United Kingdom's National Insurance Act as its provisions took effect. Men were eligible to receive ten shillings per week for illness, and women seven shillings and sixpence per week. After 13 weeks, the benefits for both men and women were five shillings a week.
- Born:
  - Lloyd Bridges, American actor, best known for his lead roles in the television adventure series Sea Hunt and comedic roles in Airplane! and Hot Shots!; in San Leandro, California (d. 1998)
  - Alexander Marinesko, Soviet Navy submarine officer, captain of S-13 which sank the German ship Wilhelm Gustloff and killed 9,000 people in 1945 during World War II; in Odessa, Russian Empire (now Ukraine) (d. 1963)

== January 16, 1913 (Thursday) ==
- The Parliament of the United Kingdom passed the Irish Home Rule Bill on its third reading, by a vote of 367 to 257. The measure moved on to the House of Lords where it was vetoed on January 30.
- The first wireless transmission between the United States and Germany was sent in the inauguration of a new telegraph system at Sayville, New York, with the message received in Berlin.
- The British cargo and passenger ship SS Veronese, transporting 221 people on board from Europe to South America, was sailing in a fog when it crashed into rocks off the coast of Leça da Palmeira in Portugal. Although most of the people on board were rescued over the next two days, 33 passengers and five crewmen were killed.
- Grande Duke Michael Alexandrovich was stripped of his rank as officer in the Imperial Russian Army, after his controversial marriage was met by the disapproval of his brother Tsar Nicholas.
- The painting Ivan the Terrible and His Son Ivan by Ilya Repin was vandalized in Tretyakov Gallery, Moscow. The portrait faces of Ivan the Terrible and Ivan Ivanovich were slashed by a knife. Gallery director Ilya Ostroukhov resigned over the incident and Repin was called in to repair the painting. The painting was vandalized again in 2018.
- Srinivasa Ramanujan, a 26-year-old student in Madras, sent a letter to English mathematician G. H. Hardy, admitting that he had no formal mathematical training, but submitting more than 100 theorems that Hardy recognized as ingenious.
- Died: Thaddeus S. C. Lowe, 80, American meteorologist and balloonist, pioneer in aerial reconnaissance (b. 1832)

== January 17, 1913 (Friday) ==
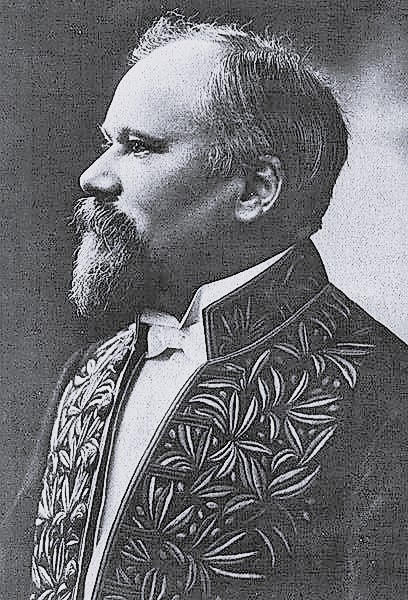
President-elect Raymond Poincaré

- Prime Minister Raymond Poincaré was elected as the new President of France. After none of the three candidates received a majority on the first ballot, the result on the second round was Prime Minister Poincaré 483, Agriculture Minister Jules Pams 296 and Marie Eduard Maillant 69.
- The six European powers sent a joint note advising the Ottoman Empire to surrender Adrianople and the Aegean Islands.
- Mohammad-Ali Ala ol-Saltaneh became the 12th Premier of Persia.
- The villages of Delburne and Oyen, Alberta, were established in Canada.

== January 18, 1913 (Saturday) ==
- The Ottoman Navy attempted to break the Greek naval blockade in the Dardanelles off Lemnos, Greece. Despite firing more rounds, Ottoman ships missed their targets more often than the Greeks, who in turn were able to score more hits. As a result, three Ottoman ships were damaged, 41 sailors were killed and another 105 were wounded. The Greeks sustained only one wounded casualty. The Ottoman fleet retreated to its base within the Dardanelles, from which it would not venture for the rest of the war.
- The British Antarctic Expedition was able to continue as the research ship Terra Nova finally broke through the ice outside of Antarctica's McMurdo Sound to pick up the Northern Party, the remaining members of the expedition. The group had set out to locate the Southern Party that had been led by Robert Falcon Scott. Victor L. A. Campbell reported to the Terra Nova crew that Scott's party had reached the South Pole on January 17, 1912, but all died on the return journey.
- Born: George Unwin, British air force officer, noted fighter pilot during the Battle of Britain, commander of the No. 84 Squadron post-World War II, recipient of the Distinguished Service Order and Distinguished Flying Medal; in Barnsley, South Yorkshire (d. 2006)

== January 19, 1913 (Sunday) ==
- A new war between white Americans and the Ute Native American tribe was threatened when a group of 50 Utes confronted a 100-man posse from the Montezuma County, Colorado Sheriff's Office that had arrived at the Southern Ute Indian Reservation to arrest one of the prominent Ute members, Big Rabbit, on charges arising from the shooting of a Mexican sheep herder during a gunfight that killed another Ute. Sheriff James Gawith and his deputies were met by a crowd of Utes armed with rifles, and vowed to fight to the death before surrendering their comrade. The standoff would continue for five more months and would require the intervention of Colorado Governor Elias M. Ammons, who would announce on May 30 a settlement whereby Big Rabbit would surrender to Colorado authorities at Durango and be released on bond pending a fair trial, where he would be represented by a U.S. District Attorney.
- William Howard Taft, the outgoing President of the United States who had been defeated for re-election in November, criticized the United States Senate in an address in commemoration of the 70th anniversary of the Order of the B'nai B'rith. "I had a dream that we were going to take a long step toward universal peace," he told the Jewish advocacy organization in New York City, "but after negotiating a treaty with England and a treaty with France, I awoke."
- For the first time in its brief history, the Chicago Grand Opera Company was forced to cancel its scheduled performance because of a labor strike. Hours before the curtain was to rise for Pagliacci, featuring visiting star dancer Adeline Genée, the chorus girls demanded a 50 cent raise for performing on Sunday, from $2.00 to $2.50. Reportedly, the manager "waved crisp $2 notes in their faces" and told the women "Take it or leave it!" The chorus chose the latter, and the patrons were given refunds.
- A retrospective on the works of German artist Lovis Corinth opened at the Munich Secession galleries in Munich.
- Born:
  - Jan Linssen, Dutch football player, forward for Feyenoord, most error-free player in the Dutch first division football league; in Rotterdam (d. 1995)
  - Rudolf Wanderone, American billiards player and entertainer who, billed himself as "Minnesota Fats" after the release of the 1961 film The Hustler; in New York City (d. 1996)
  - Anthony Dexter, American film actor, best known for his bio pics including Rudolph Valentino in Valentino, Billy the Kid in The Parson and the Outlaw, and Christopher Columbus in The Story of Mankind; as Walter Fleischmann, in Talmage, Nebraska (d. 2001)
- Died: Claas Epp Jr., 74, Russian Mennonite religious leader who had predicted that the Second Coming would occur on March 8, 1889, and again on March 8, 1891 (b. 1838)

== January 20, 1913 (Monday) ==
- Outgoing U.S. President William Howard Taft accepted a position as a professor at the Yale University College of Law.
- Bulgaria, Serbia and Montenegro presented an ultimatum to the Ottoman Empire, giving the Turks 14 days to make a favorable reply to their demands or face a resumption of war.
- The first film footage of war scenes in color was shown, having been taken during the First Balkan War under the direction of British war correspondent Frederic Villiers, who accompanied a division of the Greek Army.
- The Ijebu Ode Grammar School was established in Ijebu Ode in British Nigeria, and remains the oldest operating school in the country.
- Died: José Guadalupe Posada, 60, Mexican artist, best known for his illustrations including La Calavera Catrina (b. 1852)

== January 21, 1913 (Tuesday) ==
- Aristide Briand was selected as the Prime Minister of France, to replace Raymond Poincaré, who had vacated the office after being elected president.
- Canadian Member of Parliament W.F. MacLean of South York made the first proposal for a central Canadian bank, in a speech on the floor of the House of Commons.
- Died:
  - Fanny Jackson Coppin, 76, American religious leader and activist, proponent for university education for women, particularly those of color (b. 1837)
  - Aluísio Azevedo, Brazilian writer, 55, chairman of Brazilian Academy of Letters and author of O Mulato (b. 1857)

== January 22, 1913 (Wednesday) ==
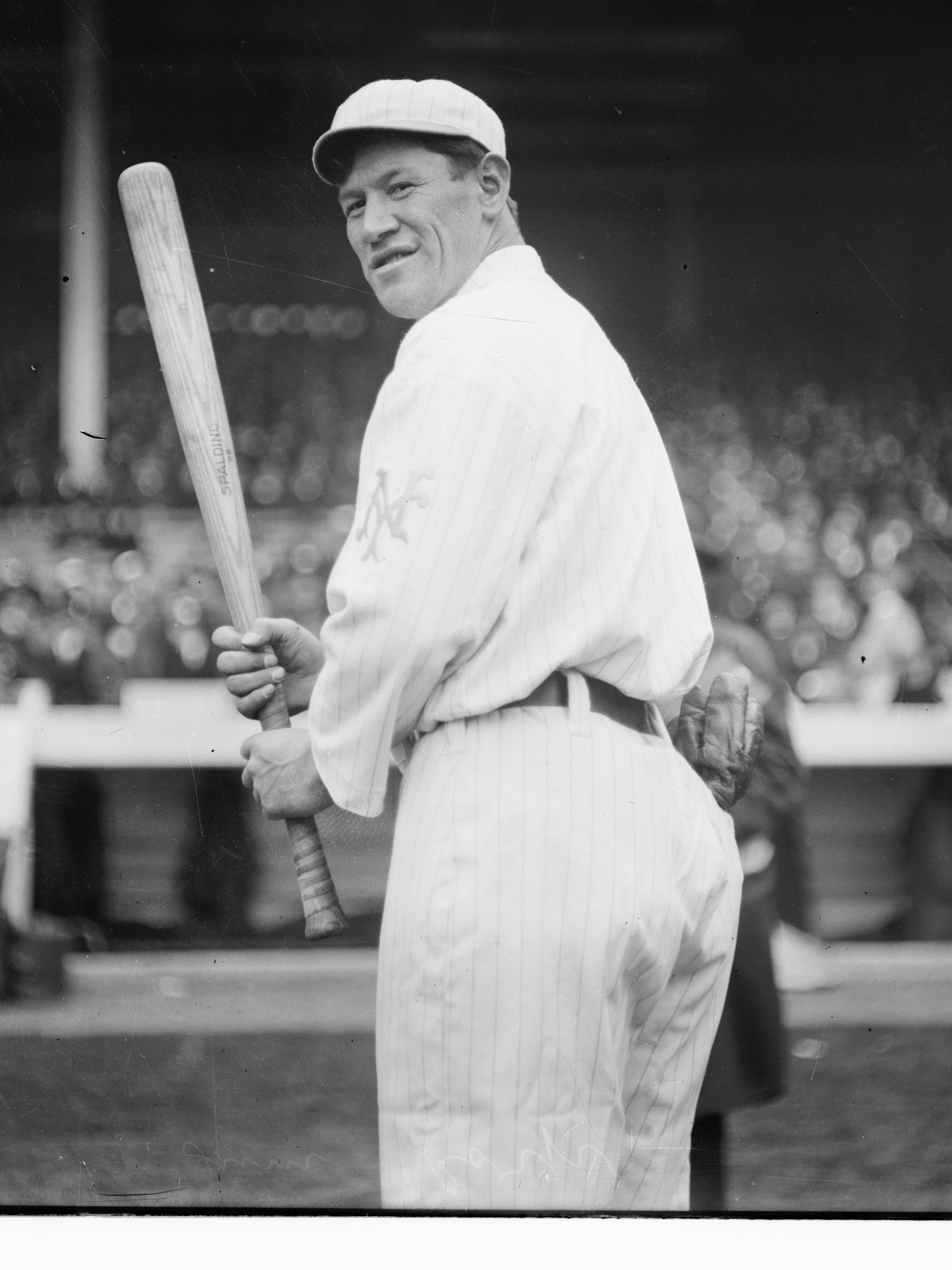
Jim Thorpe at the New York Polo Grounds in 1913

- The Ottoman Grand Council voted to surrender Edirne (Adrianople) to the Balkan Allies and to accept the other demands for peace, including ceding its Aegean islands.
- The battleship Rio de Janeiro was launched by Armstrong Whitworth in Newcastle upon Tyne, England for service in the Brazilian Navy. It was sold to the Ottoman Empire by December of that year and renamed Sultan Osman I. It was seized by the Royal Navy at the start of World War I and renamed HMS Agincourt where it served out the way before being decommissioned in 1921.
- The Gazette of Worcester, Massachusetts, published a story that cost Jim Thorpe his Olympic medals. One of the sportswriters for the Gazette had played minor league baseball in the Eastern Carolina League for the Fayetteville Highlanders and was aware that Thorpe had played in the league in the 1909 and 1910 seasons. The Gazette editor had spent eight days verifying the fact before breaking the news that Thorpe had played professional ball for Fayetteville and for the Rocky Mount Railroaders. The headline was "Thorpe With Professional Baseball Team Says Clancy", and quoted Charley Clancy, who had tipped off reporter Roy Johnson.
- Helen Miller Gould, America's "Queen Philanthropist", married Finley J. Shepard.
- Born:
  - William Conway, Irish Roman Catholic cardinal and Primate of All Ireland from 1963 to 1977; in Belfast (now Northern Ireland )(d. 1977)
  - Carl F. H. Henry, American theologian, Baptist minister and first editor and publisher of Christianity Today; in Long Island, New York (d. 2003)

== January 23, 1913 (Thursday) ==
- The "Raid on the Sublime Porte" took place as the Grand Vizier of the Ottoman Empire, Kâmil Pasha, was forced to resign, at gunpoint, and Navy Minister Nazım Pasha was shot and killed. The mob of perpetrators, members of Enver Bey's rival organization, the Committee of Union and Progress, installed Mahmud Shevket Pasha as the new Grand Vizier.
- Seven U.S. soldiers were killed in the Philippines at Jolo during a fight with the Igorot residents.
- Albert Solomon was re-elected as Premier of Tasmania in Australia with the seats in the Tasmanian House of Assembly virtually unchanged following the election.
- Born: Wally Parks, American racing driver, founder of the National Hot Rod Association; as Wallace Parks, in Goltry, Oklahoma (d. 2007)

== January 24, 1913 (Friday) ==
- Former Socialist Party presidential candidate Eugene V. Debs was arrested at Terre Haute, weeks after being indicted for obstructing justice. Debs was quickly released on bail, and the case would be dismissed in May.
- The cabinet of Jens Bratlie, Prime Minister of Norway, resigned.
- The United States Senate approved the construction of the Lincoln Memorial. On January 29, the United States House of Representatives appropriated $2 million in funding for the building.
- The Picture House opened on Oxford Street, Westminster, London to premier the film The Miracle, directed by French actor turned filmmaker Michel-Antoine Carré and featuring the new technology Pathécolor which could feature films in color.
- The football club Independiente Rivadavia was established in Mendoza, Argentina.
- The Shire of Gowrie was dissolved in Queensland, Australia and split between the Town of Newtown and the Shire of Jondaryan.
- Born:
  - Ray Stehr, Australian rugby player, prop for the Eastern Suburbs from 1929 to 1946 and the Australia national rugby league team from 1933 to 1938; as Raymon Stehr, in Warialda, New South Wales (d. 1983)
  - Norman Dello Joio, American composer, known for works including Variations, Chaconne and Finale, recipient of the Pulitzer Prize for Music for Meditations on Ecclesiastes; in New York City (d. 2008)

== January 25, 1913 (Saturday) ==
- The United States House of Representatives passed the Dillingham-Burnett immigration bill, requiring a literacy test for all incoming immigrants, by a 166-71 margin.
- Royal Navy destroyer Ambuscade was launched by John Brown & Company in Clydebank, Scotland. It would serve as part of the Grand Fleet during World War I.
- The Shire of Crows Nest was established in Queensland, Australia.
- Born:
  - Witold Lutosławski, Polish composer, known for works including Concerto for Orchestra and Jeux vénitiens; in Warsaw, Congress Poland, Russian Empire (d. 1994)
  - Huang Hua, Foreign Minister of the People's Republic of China from 1976 to 1982; as Wang Rumei, in Ci County, Hebei, Republic of China (d. 2010)

== January 26, 1913 (Sunday) ==
- The body of John Paul Jones was inhumed at the chapel of the United States Naval Academy in Annapolis, Maryland, more than seven years after it had been returned to the United States from France.
- The new stadium Campo da Constituição opened in Porto, Portugal with a football tournament hosted by Porto.
- Football club Louviéroise was established in La Louvière, Belgium.
- Born: Jimmy Van Heusen, American composer, four-time recipient of the Academy Award for Best Original Song, known for "Swinging on a Star" and "High Hopes"; as Edward Chester Babcock, in Syracuse, New York (d. 1990)

== January 27, 1913 (Monday) ==
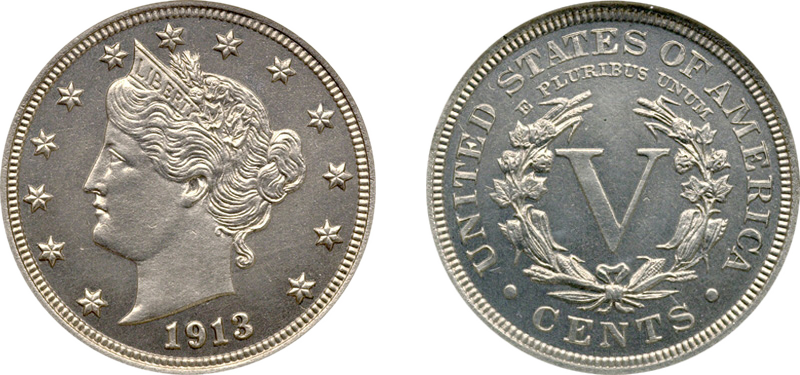
The old "Liberty Head nickel"

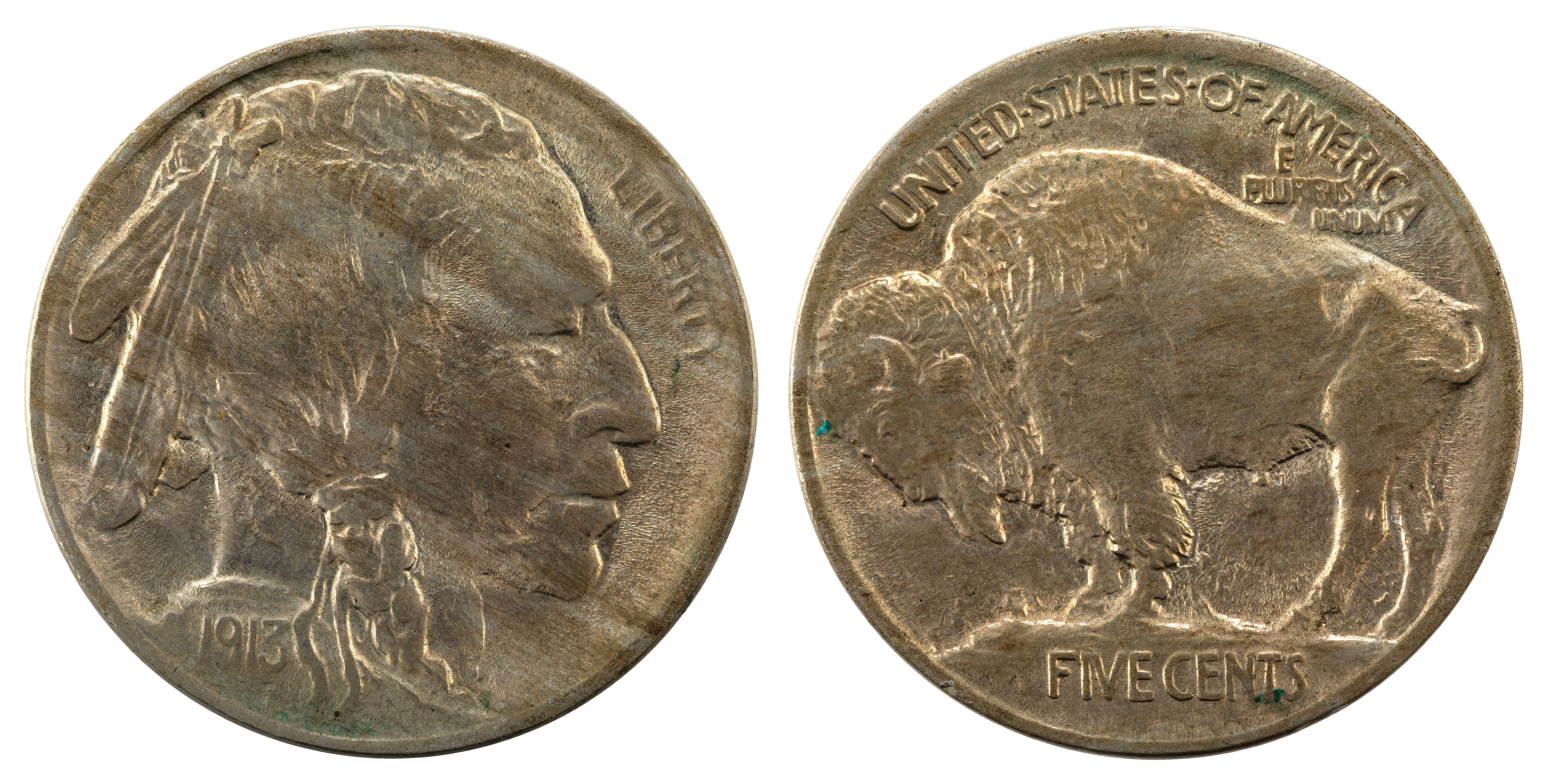
The new "Buffalo nickel"

- Arizona's four electoral votes for Woodrow Wilson in the 1912 U.S. presidential election had not been received at the U.S. Vice President's office as the 6:00 pm deadline set by the Electoral College expired. Wilfred T. Webb, an Arizona legislator, had departed Phoenix on January 17 but had stopped in St. Louis, Missouri, rather than proceeding directly to the nation's capital. Webb arrived the next afternoon at 4:00 pm and told reporters, "I took my time about getting to Washington, because I was under the impression that I had until February 1 in which to deliver our four electoral votes."
- The British Cabinet voted to remove the women's suffrage bill from consideration in the House of Commons.
- The first new American five-cent pieces, known as "buffalo nickels," were manufactured at the Philadelphia Mint.

== January 28, 1913 (Tuesday) ==
- The Young Turks council of the Committee of Union and Progress voted unanimously to fight the surrender of Edirne (Adrianople) and the Aegean islands, in accordance with the demands of the new leader, Enver Bey.
- The Apostolic Vicariate of Bangueolo was established in Southern Rhodesia by the White Fathers Catholic missionary society in what is now Zambia. It was split apart in 1952 when the Roman Catholic Archdiocese of Kasama was established.
- The Apostolic Vicariate of Nekemte was established in Nekemte, Ethiopia.
- Died: Segismundo Moret, 79, Spanish state leader, three-time Prime Minister of Spain between 1905 and 1910 (b. 1833)

== January 29, 1913 (Wednesday) ==
- Alpha Kappa Alpha, the first African-American sorority, was incorporated.
- Born:
  - Daniel Taradash, American screenwriter and director, best known for From Here to Eternity and Bell, Book and Candle; in Louisville, Kentucky (d. 2003)
  - Victor Mature, American film actor, known for film roles in One Million B.C., My Darling Clementine, and Kiss of Death; in Louisville, Kentucky (d. 1999)

== January 30, 1913 (Thursday) ==
- The United Kingdom's House of Lords rejected the Home Rule bill by a vote of 326–69.
- A no-confidence motion passed in the German Reichstag.
- The Ottoman Empire replied to the ultimatum of the Great Powers at the end of the First Balkan War and agreed to give up most of Edirne (Adrianople) except for the Muslim shrines, but it refused to surrender its Aegean islands.
- General Hasan Rıza Pasha, commander of defending forces during the Siege of Scutari, was assassinated in a plot organized by Essad Pasha Toptani, who took over as commander of Ottoman forces the next day.
- St Joseph's Church was consecrated in Aldershot, England.
- Born:
  - Amrita Sher-Gil, Hungarian-born Indian painter, known for her 1932 painting Young Girls; in Budapest, Kingdom of Hungary, Austria-Hungary(d. 1941)
  - Han Xianchu, Chinese army officer, commander of Chinese communist forces during the Chinese Civil War, Second Sino-Japanese War, and Korean War; in Hong'an County, Hubei province, Republic of China (d. 1986)
- Died: James Henderson Berry, 71, American politician, U.S. Senator for Arkansas for 22 years from 1885 to 1907; Governor of Arkansas from 1883 to 1885 (b. 1841)

== January 31, 1913 (Friday) ==
- Ahmed Izzet Pasha was appointed commander-in-chief of Ottoman forces.
- Gunnar Knudsen became Prime Minister of Norway for the second time, and would serve until 1920.
- The first meeting of the Lithuanian Education Society Rytas was held at clergyhouse of the Church of All Saints in Vilnius, Lithuania.
- Born: Don Hutson, American football player for the Green Bay Packers from 1935 to 1945, inductee to the Pro Football Hall of Fame and the College Football Hall of Fame; as Donald Hutson, in Pine Bluff, Arkansas (d. 1997)
- Died: James Lindsay, 65, British astronomer, president of the Royal Astronomical Society in 1878 (b. 1847)

== Sources ==
- Cinema News and Property Gazette. Vol. II. London. 1913. scan p. 413
- "Record of Current Events", The American Monthly Review of Reviews (June 1912), pp. 289–292
