= Dello Joio =

Dello Joio is a surname. Notable people with the surname include:

- Justin Dello Joio (born 1955), American composer
- Norman Dello Joio (1913–2008), American composer
- Norman Dello Joio (equestrian) (born 1956), American equestrian
