= Variations, Chaconne and Finale =

Variations, Chaconne and Finale is a set of variations for orchestra composed by Norman Dello Joio in 1947; the piece was premiered in Pittsburgh, under the direction of Fritz Reiner, on January 30, 1948. It won the New York Critics Circle Award for the year. Its primary theme an orchestral version of that of the first movement of his celebrated Piano Sonata No. 3.

The theme for the piece, presented by the oboe, is derived from the Kyrie movement of the Missa de Angelis, and much of the work is subdued and religious in tone. In the first part of the piece, after its initial presentation, the melody is the subject of six variations. The chaconne is built from its first four notes, but in chromatic form. The finale, by contrast to the rest of the work, is spirited and joyous. The work ends with a loud return of the theme's first four notes.
