= Justin Dello Joio =

American composer (born 1955)

- Born: October 18, 1955 (age 70); New York City, New York, U.S.
- Occupations: Composer, professor

Academic background
- Education: B.M. in Composition; M.Mus. in Composition; DMusA in Composition
- Alma mater: Juilliard School of Music
- Thesis: (1987)
- Doctoral advisor: Vincent Persichetti
- Website: justindellojoio.net

Justin Dello Joio (born October 18, 1955) is an American composer and the fifth-generation composer in the Dello Joio family.

== Early life and education ==
Dello Joio is the son of composer Norman Dello Joio. He completed his formal education at the Juilliard School, earning a Bachelor's, Master's, and a Doctoral degree in composition where he studied with Vincent Persichetti, Roger Sessions, and David Diamond. During his years at Juilliard, he was honored with an annual composition award.

== Life and career ==
Dello Joio has worked as a composer throughout his adult life. He was honored with the American Academy of Arts and Letters Award in Music in 2004, and the American Academy's Virgil Thompson Award for his opera Blue Mountain. His music, although not part of the American Neo Romantic style, is noted for its communicative emotional content, structural clarity and colorful orchestration, and his early influences include music of composers Jacob Druckman and Witold Lutosławski.

Dello Joio's recent Concerto for Piano and Orchestra Oceans Apart was commissioned by the Boston Symphony Orchestra for Garrick Ohlsson, and premiered with Ohlsson and Alan Gilbert conducting the Boston Symphony in Symphony Hall in January 2023. His music has been performed by the Boston Symphony, The Detroit Symphony, The Lincoln Center Chamber Music Society, The American Brass Quintet, Garrick Ohlsson, Carter Brey, Ani Kavafian, Jeremy Denk, Jay Campbell, Stephan Gosling, Meral Guneyman and William Wolfram. He has received commissions from the Boston Symphony Orchestra, the Koussevitsky Foundation, and the New York Philharmonic principal cellist, Carter Brey. His one-act opera, Blue Mountain, was commissioned by Det Norske Blaseensemble and was recorded and released by Bridge Records.

Dello Joio has taught composition and related subjects at New York University beginning in 1983, and has been a faculty composer-in-residence at the Steinhardt Music Department at New York University since 2008 and a professor of orchestration in the Department of Composition at the Juilliard School College since 2017. He has been guest composer in residence at Vienna Summer Music Festival (2019), São Paulo Contemporary Music Festival (2018), Charles Ives Music Festival (2017).

== Catalogue of selected works ==
- 1978 – String Quartet No. 1, recorded by the Primavera String Quartet, Grenadilla Records, published in 1990 by Theodore Presser.
- 1987 – Musica Humana, symphonic poem for large orchestra, premiered at Alice Tully Hall, Lincoln Center, New York, Sixten Ehrling conducting the Juilliard Symphony and published by G. Schirmer, Detroit Symphony Orchestra, Kenneth Jean conducting
- 1987 – Sonata for Piano, premiered at the National Gallery of Art, Washington DC, pianist Meral Guneyman, as featured work in the American Festival of Contemporary Music. The premiere was broadcast on the classical radio station WGMS Washington; recorded on Bridge Records by Garrick Ohlsson, recorded by Meral Guneyman
- 1995 – Transcription – New Dance, by Wallingford Riegger, commissioned to orchestrate the piano music of Riegger for the Martha Graham Dance Company. It premiered at the Brooklyn Academy of Music.
- 2001 – Two Concert Etudes for piano, premiered at Merkin Hall, New York, commissioned by the New York State Association of Music Teachers; recorded on Bridge Records by Garrick Ohlsson
- 2007 – Music for Piano Trio "The March of Folly", premiered at Lincoln Center Chamber Music Society in New York, with Ani Kavafian on violin, Carter Brey on cello, and Shai Wosner on piano, recorded on Bridge Records by Jeremy Denk, Ani Kavafian, and Carter Brey
- 2008 – Blue and Gold Music, for brass quintet and organ, commissioned for the American Brass Quintet for the 300th anniversary of the Trinity School in New York. Premiered Riverside Church in New York City with the American Brass Quintet and Colin Fowler; recorded on Summit Records – ABQ:The State of the Art.
- 2011 – Due Per Due for cello and piano, premiered at the Kravis Center, West Palm Beach in Florida with New York Philharmonic principal cellist Carter Brey and pianist Christopher O'Riley; recorded for Bridge Records
- 2012 – Blue Mountain, a chamber opera in one act, commissioned by Det Norske Blaseensemble, and premiered in Oslo Norway, in the Ultima Music Festival in 2012 in Kanonhallen. Recorded in concert in Kanonhalen in Oslo Norway, and released on Bridge Records. University of Connecticut, November 2015
- 2018 – I Carry Your Heart, commissioned by the Cincinnati Men's Chorus and premiered at the Empire City Men's Chorus
- 2023 – Concerto for Piano and Orchestra "Oceans Apart" commissioned by the Boston Symphony Orchestra, for pianist Garrick Ohlsson; recorded for Bridge Records Garrick Ohlsson and Alan Gilbert conducting the Boston Symphony Orchestra

== Awards and honors ==
- 1985 – New York Foundation for the Arts Grant
- 1996 – Wladimir and Rhonda Lakond Award, American Academy of Arts and Letters
- 1998 – John Simon Guggenheim Fellowship
- 2004 – Music Award, The American Academy of Arts and Letter
- 2005 – New York State Council on the Arts Grant
- 2006 – Aaron Copland Recording Foundation Grant, The Ditson Fund
- 2007 – Classical Recording Foundation, Composer of the Year Award
- 2013 – Suzanne and Lee Ettelson Composer's Award
- 2016 – The American Prize – 2 categories – Opera and Chamber Music
- 2023 – Virgil Thomson Award in Vocal Writing, American Academy of Arts and Letter
