= Norman Dello Joio =

American composer (1913–2008)

- Born: January 24, 1913; New York City, New York, U.S.
- Died: July 24, 2008 (aged 95); East Hampton, New York, U.S.
- Education: Juilliard School
- Occupations: composer, educator, organist
- Known for: Choral music; Meditations on Ecclesiastes; Fantasies on a Theme by Haydn
- Children: Justin Dello Joio
- Awards: Pulitzer Prize for Music (1957); Primetime Emmy Award (1965)

Norman Dello Joio (January 24, 1913 – July 24, 2008) was an American composer active for over half a century. Best known for his choral music, he won a Pulitzer Prize for Music in 1957.

== Life ==
Dello Joio was born in New York City to Italian immigrants. He began his musical career as organist and choir director at the Star of the Sea Church on City Island in New York at age 14. His father, Casimiro Dello Joio, was an organist, pianist, part-time composer, and vocal coach and coached many opera stars from the Metropolitan Opera. He taught Norman piano starting at the age of four. In his teens, Norman began studying organ with his godfather, Pietro Yon, who was the organist at Saint Patrick's Cathedral. In 1939, he received a scholarship to the Juilliard School, where he studied composition with Bernard Wagenaar.

While he was a student, he worked as organist at St. Anne's Church, but he soon decided that he didn't want to make his living as an organist. In 1941, he began studying with Paul Hindemith, who encouraged him to follow his own lyrical bent, rather than sacrificing it to atonal systems.

He received numerous awards and much recognition. He was a prolific composer in a variety of genres, but is perhaps best known for his choral music. Perhaps Dello Joio's best known work in the wind ensemble form is his Fantasies on a Theme by Haydn, which was composed for the Michigan State University Wind Ensemble and has been performed thousands of times internationally. Dello Joio also wrote several pieces for high school and professional string orchestra, including the difficult piece Choreography: Three Dances for String Orchestra. In 1948, he became associated with the dancer Martha Graham, for whom he wrote several works, including Diversion of Angels and Seraphic Dialogue, a recomposition for chamber orchestra of his Symphony: The Triumph of Saint Joan.

He won the 1957 Pulitzer Prize for Music for his Meditations on Ecclesiastes; first performed at the Juilliard School on April 20, 1956. His Variations, Chaconne and Finale won the New York Critics Circle Award in 1948. It is a full-orchestra expansion of the theme and variations in the first movement of his Piano Sonata No. 3.

In 1965, Dello Joio received the Emmy Award for the "most outstanding music written for television in the 1964–1965 Season" for his score to the 1964 NBC television special The Louvre. The composer created a five-movement suite for wind band entitled Scenes from The Louvre. The suite was commissioned by Baldwin-Wallace College for their symphonic band, and was premiered on March 13, 1966 with the composer conducting.

He taught at Sarah Lawrence College from 1944 to 1950, and at the Mannes College of Music. He also served as professor and dean at Boston University's College of Fine Arts. In 1978, he retired and moved to Long Island. He donated his personal archive of manuscripts and papers to the Music Division of the New York Public Library for the Performing Arts.

Despite infirmities, Dello Joio remained active as a composer until his final years, continuing to produce chamber, choral, and even orchestral music. He died in his sleep on July 24, 2008 at the age of 95 at his home in East Hampton, New York.

He had one daughter, performer, teacher and speaker coach, Victoria Dello Joio, and two sons, composer Justin Dello Joio and equestrian Norman Dello Joio.

== Musical analysis ==
Dello Joio's early works already reveal certain characteristics of his style. He liked to use traditional early music chants as a cantus firmus with richly contrapuntal settings. Gregorian melodies and jazzy rhythms are blended in a creatively spontaneous texture.

One use of his music is his score for choreographer Martha Graham's Diversion of Angels.

== Catalogue of works ==
1937 (Began studies at Juilliard in the fall)

- Ballad of Thomas Jefferson for voice (words by Louis Lerman; publ. Weaner-Levant 1943)
- Quartet for four bassoons (unpublished, now lost)
- Sonata [#1] for Violin and Piano (unpublished, now lost)
- Sonata for Cello and Piano (unpublished, "Sonatina" manuscript in New York Public Library)
- Trio for piano, violin and cello (unpublished, now lost) Winner of the Elizabeth Sprague Coolidge Award

1938

- Colloquy for violin and piano (unpublished, manuscript in New York Public Library)
- Sonata [#2] for violin and piano (unpublished, now lost)

1939

- Chicago for mixed chorus a cappella (text by Carl Sandburg; unpublished, manuscript is in New York Public Library)
- Concertino for flute and strings (unpublished, manuscript in New York Public Library and at Juilliard library) [Broadcast from the Eastman School of Music in 1953 of movements 2 & 3] [historical rehearsal radio broadcast on WNYC with the composer talking includes a run-through of all 3 movements]
- "Gone" for voice and piano (unpublished, manuscript in New York Public Library, poem by Carl Sandburg)
- "Joy" for voice and piano (unpublished, manuscript in New York Public Library, poem by Carl Sandburg)
- "Mill Doors" for voice and piano (text by Carl Sandburg; publ. Carl Fischer, 1948) [included in Three Songs 1948]
- Quartet for flute, oboe, clarinet and bassoon (unpublished, now lost)

1940

- Ballad for string orchestra (unpublished, manuscript lost?)
- Concertino (in Stilo Classico) for piano and orchestra (unpublished, manuscript lost?) [Radio recording from WYNC archives from 1947 American Music Festival]
- Sinfonietta for orchestra (G. Schirmer or unpublished? Manuscript in New York Public Library) [Used in a four-hand reduction for ballet "Prairie"]
- Suite for piano (publ. G. Schirmer 1945) [Performance by Debra Torok]
- Trio for clarinet, French horn and bassoon (unpublished, now lost) [Recording from WYNC archives, probably 1941]

1941 (finished studies at Juilliard; attended Tanglewood, studying with Paul Hindemith)

- Concerto for Two Pianos and orchestra (unpublished, manuscript in New York Public Libirary)
- The Duke of Sacramento, ballet for two pianos (unpublished; manuscript in the New York Public Library) [An excerpt became the Rhumba for two pianos]
- Prairie, ballet for two pianos (unpublished, manuscript lost?) [reduction of Sinfonietta from orchestra]
- Spoon River, incidental music for piano (unpublished, manuscript?)
- Vigil Strange for mixed chorus and piano (four hands) (text by Walt Whitman; publ. Weaner-Levant 1943)

1942 (completed independent study with Paul Hindemith)

- Fantasia on a Gregorian Theme for violin and piano (publ. Carl Fischer 1949) [theme title is Ite Missa Est]
- Magnificat for orchestra (publ. Carl Fischer 1944) Town Hall Composition Award, 1943 [Radio broadcast recording with NBC Symphony at 1944 Music Critic's Circle Awards]

1943

- Greentree Thoroughbred, documentary film score (music and film are missing and presumed lost)
- The Mystic Trumpeter, for mixed SSAATTBB chorus, soprano, and French horn (text adapted from Walt Whitman; publ. G. Schirmer 1945)
- Prelude to a Young Dancer, for piano (publ. G. Schirmer 1946) [performance by Debra Torok]
- Prelude: To a Young Musician for piano (publ. G. Schirmer 1945) [Performance by Debra Torok]
- Sextet for three recorders (or Woodwind Trio) and string trio (publ. Hargail Music Press 1944)
- Sonata No. 1 for piano (publ. Hargail Music Press 1947) [Performance by Sidney Foster]
- Sonata No. 2 for piano (publ. G. Schirmer 1948) [Recording by Jorge Bolet]
- To a Lone Sentry, for orchestra (publ. G. Schirmer 1945)

1944

- Concert Music for orchestra (publ. Carl Fischer 1949)
- Concertino for harmonica and orchestra (unpublished, manuscript score and parts in New York Public Library)
- Duo Concertante for two pianos (unpublished, manuscript in New York Public Library)
- Duo Concertato for cello and piano (publ. G. Schirmer 1949)
- Fanfare for Victor and the Oklahoma Symphony for orchestral brass (manuscript in the New York Public Library)
- Rhumba, for Two Pianos (unpublished; holograph in the Juilliard library) [arranged excerpt from The Duke of Sacramento]
- Trio for flute, cello, and piano (publ. Carl Fischer 1948) [Performance by the George Crumb Trio]

1945

- Concerto for harp and orchestra (publ. Carl Fischer 1946) [1947 recording with Edward Vito]
- On Stage, ballet score for orchestra (publ. G. Schirmer)
- Suite from "On Stage" for two pianos, or orchestra,
- Symphony for Voices and Orchestra (text "Western Star" by Stephen Vincent Benét) [withdrawn 1952, reworked into Song of Affirmation] [live recording of Carnegie Hall debut performance]

1946

- A Fable for mixed chorus and piano (Text: The Mouse That Gnawed the Oak Tree Down by Vachel Lindsay; publ. Carl Fischer 1947) [Performance by Estherville High School Varsity Chorus]
- A Jubilant Song for mixed (or women's or men's chorus) and piano (now also orchestra or band), (Text by Walt Whitman; publ. G. Schirmer) [Later incorporated into As of A Dream] [Performance by the Quad City Choral Arts, John Hurty conducting]
- New Born for voice (text: Lenore Marshall; publ. Carl Fischer 1948) [included in Three Songs 1948] [performance by Lila Deis]
- Nocturne in F-sharp for piano (publ. Carl Fischer 1950; first performance 1949) [Performance by Debra Torok]
- Nocturne in E for piano (publ. Carl Fischer 1950) [Performance by Debra Torok]
- "There Is a Lady Sweet and Kind" for voice and piano (text by anonymous Elizabethan; publ. Carl Fischer 1948) [one of Three Songs, publ. 1950 Carl Fischer] [Recording by Cesare Valletti]
- Ricercari [original title: Tre Ricercare] for piano and orchestra (publ. Carl Fischer) [Recording by Germaine Smadja]

1947

- The Assassination: Two Fates Discuss a Human Problem, for voice and piano (text adapted from Robert Hillyer; publ. Carl Fischer 1949) [one of Three Songs, publ. 1950 Carl Fischer] [Recording by Kevin Maynor]
- Lament, for voice and piano (text by Chidiock Tichborne, written on the eve of the poet's execution; publ. Carl Fischer 1949) [one of Three Songs, publ. 1950 Carl Fischer]
- Madrigal, for mixed chorus and piano (text by Christina Rossetti; Publ. Carl Fischer)
- Sonata No. 3 for piano (publ. Carl Fischer 1948) [partially a reworking of the orchestral Variations, Chaconne and Finale] [Performance by Tanya Stambuk]
- Variations, Chaconne and Finale for orchestra [aka Symphonic Dances] (publ. Carl Fischer 1950) [Now also band version] Winner of New York Music Critics Circle Award [reworked into portions of the Piano Sonata No. 3] [Recording by Eugene Ormandy and the Philadelphia Orchestra]

1948

- Serenade for orchestra [concert version of Martha Graham ballet "Diversion of Angels"] (publ. Carl Fischer 1953) [Recording by Edvard Tchivzhel and the Atlantic Sinfonietta]
- Six Love Songs for voice and piano (texts: J. Addington Symonds "Eyebright"; John Suckling "Why so pale and wan, fond lover?"; Robert Browning "Meeting at Night"; Stark Young "The Dying Nightingale"; Arthur Symons "All Things Leave Me"; and Elizabeth Barrett Browning "How Do I Love Thee?"; publ. Carl Fischer 1954)
- Variations and Capriccio for violin and piano (publ. Carl Fischer 1949) [Recording with William Steck, violin]

1949

- Concertante for clarinet and orchestra (or piano) (commissioned by Big Band clarinetist Artie Shaw; publ. Carl Fischer 1955); Shaw premiered the work with the Chautauqua (NY) Symphony on 23 July 1949, Franco Autori conducting. [Recording with Robert Alemany, clarinet]
- Diversion of Angels ballet score for small orchestra [Video of Martha Graham Ballet Company performing the ballet]

1950

- The Triumph of Joan, opera in 3 Acts [school version – withdrawn; musical themes reworked into Triumph of St. Joan Symphony]
- The Bluebird for mixed chorus and piano (text: Joseph Machlis; publ. Carl Fischer 1952) [Performance by the John Alexander Singers] [Main theme from this used again in the opening movement of the Triumph of St. Joan Symphony]
- A Psalm of David for mixed chorus, strings, brass, and percussion [also version with woodwinds instead of chorus; and version for chorus and band] (text: Psalm 51; publ. Carl Fischer 1951) [Performance of final 10 minutes by the 2002 Texas All-State Choir]

1951

- Epigraph for orchestra (publ. Carl Fischer 1953) [Recording by the Vienna Symphony]
- The Triumph of Saint Joan Symphony for orchestra (publ. 1952) [music taken from withdrawn 1950 opera; also used in a reduced orchestration for Martha Graham ballet "Seraphic Dialogues" in 1955] [Performance by Boston Modern Orchestra Project] [Shares a theme that is also used in the Bluebird]

1952

- Aria and Toccata for two pianos (publ. Carl Fischer 1955) [Recording by Rosi and Toni Grunschlag]
- New York Profiles for orchestra [partially transcribed for band much later as City Profiles] (Publ. Carl Fischer) [Recording by the Orchestra Society of La Jola, Nikolai Sokoloff conducting]
- Song of the Open Road for mixed chorus, trumpet, and piano (text adapted from Walt Whitman; publ. Carl Fischer 1953) [Performance by the New Jersey All-State Chorus, Helen Stanley, conductor]

1953

- The Ruby, opera in one act (from William Gibson short story; publ. Ricordi rental 1955)
- Song of Affirmation for mixed chorus, soprano, narrator, and orchestra (text: adapted from the poem Western Start by Stephen Vincent Benet; publ. Carl Fischer) [reworked version of the withdrawn Symphony for Voices and Orchestra] [Performance with Indianapolis Symphony]
- The Tall Kentuckian, incidental music for soloists, chorus, and orchestra (publ. Carl Fischer)
- Somebody's Coming for mixed chorus and piano [from The Tall Kentuckian]
- Sweet Sunny for mixed chorus and piano (publ. 1954) [from The Tall Kentuckian]

1954

- Adieu, Mignonne, When You Are Gone for women's chorus and piano (Text: Owen Meredith; publ. Carl Fischer 1955)
- The Lamentation of Saul for baritone, flute, oboe, clarinet, viola, and piano [also version for full orchestra] (text: adapted from D.H. Lawrence; publ. Carl Fischer 1970) [1958 recording in original chamber setting with baritone it was written for, Leonard Warren]

1955

- The Listeners for voice and piano (text: Walter de la Mare; publ. Carl Fischer 1960) [Recording by William Parker]
- The Trial at Rouen, opera in two acts (publ. Ricordi; premiered on NBC television in 1956)

1956

- Air Power, television score for orchestra; symphonic suite for orchestra (Publ. C. Fischer) [10-minute excerpt of recording by Eugene Ormandy and the Philadelphia Orchestra]
- Hush Thee, Princeling (Lullaby for the Christ Child), Church Hymn for Unison chorus and organ, or SATB chorus and opt. organ (Publ. in American Hymns Old and New, Columbia University Press, 1980) [Performance by the TENET Vocal Artists]
- Meditations on Ecclesiastes for string orchestra [Jose Limon ballet title "There is a Time"] (Publ. Carl Fischer) Pulitzer Prize, 1957. [Recording by the Philharmonia Orchestra, David Amos, conductor]

1957

- Ballad of the Seven Lively Arts (Profile of a Composer) [formerly "Big City" from Air Power], for Piano and Orchestra (publ Carl Fischer) Written specifically for TV anthology series ("Seven Lively Arts"), an episode of which was titled "Profile of a Composer" and was all about him. [Performance with composer at the piano]
- Here is New York, television score for episode of "Seven Lively Arts" (unpublished? Suite published by Carl Fischer) [used some themes from New York Profiles]

1958

- O Sing unto the Lord (Psalm 98) for male TTBB chorus and organ (commissioned by Yale Univ.; publ. Carl Fischer 1959) [Performance by the Langsford Men's Chorus, Steve SeGraves conductor]
- To Saint Cecilia for mixed chorus and brass (text based on John Dryden's "A Song for St. Cecilia's Day"; publ. Carl Fischer) [Performance by Columbia University]
- The Triumph of Saint Joan, opera in two acts (publ. Deshon) [revised Trial at Rouen with 3 additional sections; this final version unavailable?] Winner of New York Music Critics Circle Award 1960

1959

- Un Sonetto di Petrarca for voice (publ. E.B. Marks 1964)

1960

- A Christmas Carol for voice and piano (or for SATB and 4-hand Piano, 1967) (Text: G.K. Chesterton; Publ. E.B. Marks) [Performance by the South Suburban Chorale, Albert Jackson conducting]
- Anthony and Cleopatra, incidental music for small orchestra (Carl Fischer)
- Kamikaze (score for TV documentary)
- Prayers of Cardinal Newman for mixed chorus and organ (text from Roman Latin, translated by Cardinal Newman; publ. Carl Fischer 1962)
- Vanity Fair, television score (for a novel by William Thackeray; unpublished, manuscript in New York Public Library)

1961

- Blood Moon, opera in three acts (unpublished)
- Fantasy and Variations for piano and orchestra (commissioned by Baldwin Piano as part of their centenary; publ. Carl Fischer 1963) [Recording of Lorin Hollander, piano, and the Boston Symphony]
- The Holy Infant's Lullaby for voice (also for mixed or women's chorus) and piano (or orchestra), (publ. 1962 [from The Saintmaker's Christmas Eve] [Recording by the Kansas City Chorale, Charles Bruffy conducting]
- The Saintmaker's Christmas Eve, television score (publ. Ricordi rental)
- The Smashing of the Reich (score for TV documentary)

1962

- Bright Star (Light of the World) for voice and piano (or 2-part or mixed chorus and piano) (publ. 1968) [from Blood Moon, incorporated into Christmas Music, 1968] [Recording by Desiree Goyette]
- Christmas Music for mixed chorus and orchestra (also for chorus and piano, or piano four hands alone) (Publ. E.B. Marks 1968) [arrangements of original and traditional carols] [Recording by Debra Turok and Marylène Dosse]
- Family Album for piano four hands (Dedicated to the composer's family; Publ. E.B. Marks) [Recording by Debra Turok and Marylène Dosse]
- Three Songs of Adieu for voice and piano (texts by Arthur Symons, John Addington Symonds; publ. E.B. Marks) [Recording by Lisa Delan]
- Time of Decision, television score (unpublished, manuscript in New York Public Library) [excerpt later published as Man From Independence]

1963

- Colloquies for violin and piano (publ. 1964 E.B. Marks)
- Espionage (TV series, episode 3)
- Night Song for piano (publ. 1965 by E.B. Marks in piano collection "American Composers of Today") [Later incorporated as movement 4 of Lyric Pieces for the Young]
- Song's End for female chorus and piano (text by John Payne; publ. E.B. Marks 1964)
- Variants on a Medieval Tune for band (publ. E.B. Marks) [Tune is In dulci jubilo; also included in The Louvre score for TV, and given further variations in band Colonial Ballads; orchestral Colonial Variants and finally in Reflections on an Ancient Hymn; also in movements 4 & 5 in the piano Diversions] [Recording by Dallas Wind Symphony, Frederick Fennell conducting]

1964

- From Every Horizon, film score (unpublished film score for World's Fair film—now lost?); version for band, 1965 (Publ. E.B. Marks) [Recording by the Keystone Wind Ensemble, Jack Stamp conducting]
- The Louvre, television score (publ. E.B. Marks?) Winner of Emmy Award [1964 TV Special "Golden Prison" about the Louvre with Dello Joio's score]
- Suite for the Young for piano (publ. E.B. Marks)
- Three Songs of Chopin for orchestra (also for two or four voice chorus with piano or orchestra; also for voice and piano) (publ. E.B. Marks)

1965

- Laudation for organ (Publ. E.B. Marks) [Live performance by Mikhail Mishchenko from St. Petersburg, Russia]
- Mass of the Bread of Life (unpublished; undated manuscript in New York Public Library; "To the memory of Pope John XXII" who died in 1963)
- Questions and Answers, duet for children (voice and piano) (unpublished; manuscript in New York Public Library)
- Scenes from "The Louvre" for band (publ. E.B. Marks 1966) [elaboration on themes used in The Louvre television score] [Recording by America's Band in Blue]

1966

- Antiphonal Fantasy on a Theme of Vincenzo Albrici, for organ, brass, and strings (Publ. E.B. Marks) [new treatment on theme first used in The Louvre television score and again in Scenes from the Louvre]
- Five Images for piano four hands (version for orchestra, 1967; publ. E.B. Marks) [One movement orchestrated for band as The Dancing Sergeant] [Recording by Debra Turok and Marylène Dosse]
- Man from Independence, for orchestra (orig. publ. E.B. Marks, later publ. Hal Leonard, now out of print) [originally included in Adventures for Orchestra, a program album: including works of 20 composers (compiled and arranged by Philip Gordon), published by Marks Music/Belwin Mills] [music from the pilot episode of planned documentary series Time of Decision; title refers to President Truman]
- Songs of Walt Whitman for mixed chorus and orchestra or piano (text based on poems of Walt Whitman; publ. E.B. Marks) [Performance by the Crane School of Music Chorus and Symphony Orchestra, 1970]

1967

- Air for Strings, for string orchestra (publ. E.B. Marks) [Performance by UW Oshkosh Orchestra]
- America and Americans (TV Score; NBC documentary based on writings of John Steinbeck; aired 12/3/67)
- Proud Music of the Storm, for mixed chorus, brass, and organ (text by Walt Whitman, publ. E.B. Marks) [Commissioned for opening of new building at Cincinnati-College Conservatory of Music]

1968

- Fantasies on a Theme by Haydn, for band (Publ. E.B. Marks) [reworked as orchestral Homage to Haydn] [Recording by the Air Force Band of the Rockies, Major Philip Chevallard conducting]
- Heloise and Abelard [Martha Graham alternate title "Time of Snow"], ballet for Orchestra and baritone voice (publ. E.B. Marks) [Later excerpted in version for band as Songs of Abelard]
- Years of the Modern, for mixed chorus, brass, and percussion (text adapted from Walt Whitman; publ. E.B. Marks)

1969

- Bagatelles for harp (Commissioned for the 1969 International Harp Competition; Publ. E.B. Marks) [Recording by Yolanda Kondonassis]
- Capriccio on the Interval of a Second for piano [Commissioned for Van Cliburn International Piano Competition](Publ. E.B. Marks) [Recording by Debra Torok]
- Homage to Haydn for orchestra [orchestral re-working of band Fantasies on a Theme by Haydn] (Publ. E.B. Marks) [Recording with Louisville Orchestra, Leonard Slatkin conducting]
- Mass [#1] for mixed chorus, brass, and organ (St. Mary's College commission; Publ. E.B. Marks, 1970)
- Note Left on a Doorstep for voice and piano (text by Lily Peter, publ. E.B. Marks)
- Songs of Abelard, for baritone solo and band (publ. E.B. Marks) [excerpt from Heloise and Abelard transcribed for band] [Recording by Univ of Central Oklahoma, Brian Lamb conducting]

1970

- Evocations, for mixed chorus and orchestra (or piano or band) (text: Richard Hovey "Promise of Spring"; Robert Hillyer "Visitants at Night"; publ. E.B. Marks)
- Variation on Happy Birthday, for Eugene Ormandy (113th Anniversary concert) [one of 20 composers to contribute a variation in honor of Ormandy] (manuscript in Univ. of Penn. Van Pelt Library)

1971

- All Is Still, monodrama for tenor solo and chamber ensemble (unpublished) [based on letter from Leopold Mozart to his son; text by William Blake]
- Choreography, Three Dances for string orchestra (Publ. 1972 by E.B. Marks) [Performance by Garland High School String Orchestra]
- Lyric Pieces for the Young for piano (E.B. Marks) [incorporates Night Song, first published in 1965 in the piano collection "American Composers of Today"]

1972

- Come to Me, My Love for mixed chorus and piano (or orchestra), (text by Christina Rossetti; publ. E.B. Marks 1973) [Performance by the Atlanta Master Chorale]
- Concertante for Wind Instruments for band (publ. E.B. Marks 1973) [Shares a musical theme with the last movement "Scherzo" of The Developing Flutist] [Recording by the Keystone Wind Ensemble]
- The Developing Flutist, suite for flute and piano (Publ. E.B. Marks) [shares musical material with band Concertante from the same year]
- Of Crows and Clusters for mixed chorus and piano (text Two Old Crows by Vachel Lindsay; publ. E.B. Marks) [Performance by the Red Robe Choir, Robert Boucher conducting]
- Psalm of Peace for mixed chorus, trumpet, French horn, and organ (text from the Psalms; publ. E.B. Marks)

1973

- Leisure for mixed chorus and piano (publ. AMP 1975)
- Lyric Fantasies for viola and string orchestra (or string quintet) (publ. AMP 1975) [reworked as final ballet for Martha Graham "Exaltation of Larks", concert title Lyric Dances]
- The Poet's Song for mixed chorus and piano (text by Alfred Lord Tennyson; publ. AMP 1974) [lyrical theme also used in middle movement of Satiric Dances]

1974

- Stage Parodies for piano-four hands (publ. AMP 1975) [music from Actor, Writer and Dancer movements also used in the 3 movements of Satiric Dances; both originating from incidental music to Aristophanes' play Thezmorphoriazousae] [Recording by Debra Turok and Marylène Dosse]
- Three Essays for clarinet and piano [2nd mvt. is same middle movement as Developing Flutist] (Publ. E.B. Marks)
- Thezmophoriazousae, incidental music for soloists, chorus and orchestra (unpublished) [selections used in Stage Parodies and Satiric Dances]

1975

- Diversions, a set of five pieces for piano (Publ. E.B. Marks) [organ transcription is titled Five Lyric Pieces; movement 2 Arietta orchestrated for strings; movement 3 Caccia orchestrated for younger band; movements 4 & 5 use In Dulci Jubilo]
- Five Lyric Pieces for the Young Organist [organ transcription of Diversions; movement 5 Giga later published separately as In Dulci Jubilo] (Publ. E.B. Marks)
- Mass [#2] in Honor of the Blessed Virgin Mary for cantor, congregation, mixed choir, and organ (optional brass) (Publ. AMP)
- Mass [#3] in Honor of the Eucharist for cantor, congregation, mixed choir, brass, organ, and strings (publ. AMP 1976)
- Notes from Tom Paine for mixed chorus and piano (JCPenney Bicentennial commission; text from Thomas Paine; publ. AMP) 1975
- Satiric Dances for a Comedy by Aristophanes for band (Commissioned for bicentennial of Battles of Lexington & Concord, April 19, 1775, the start of Revolutionary War; publ. AMP) [music also found in Stage Parodies; both originating from incidental music to Thezmorphoriazousae; lyrical theme of middle movement previously used in Poet's Song] [Performance by the Philharmonic Winds of Singapore]

1976

- Colonial Ballads for band (publ. AMP 1979) [Additional band variations on In dulci jubilo, also used in band Variations on a Medieval Theme; orchestral Colonial Variants and finally orchestral Reflections on an Ancient Hymn; theme first used in The Louvre TV score]
- Colonial Variants for orchestra (publ. AMP 1978) [13 variations based on In dulci jubilo, also used in band Variations on a Medieval Theme; Colonial Ballads and finally in orchestral Reflections on an Ancient Hymn] [Performance by Ormandy and Philadelphia Orchestra]
- Songs of Remembrance for baritone voice and orchestra (text: John Hall Wheelock; publ. AMP 1979) [Recording of premiere performance with baritone Allan Wagner and the Philadelphia Orchestra, Eugene Ormandy]
- Southern Echoes for orchestra (written for a consortium of 20 southeastern U.S. orchestras; publ. AMP)

1977

- Lyric Dances [Martha Graham ballet title: Exaltation of Larks] for Chamber Orchestra (or piano) [reworking of Lyric Fantasies] [Recording by Edvard Tchizvhel and the Atlantic Sinfonietta]

1978

- Arietta for string orchestra (E.B. Marks) [orchestration of movement 2 of Diversions]
- Caccia for band, 1978 [transcription of movement 3 of Diversions] (Publ. E.B. Marks) [Recording by Rutgers Wind Ensemble]

1979

- As of a Dream for Narrator, Soloists, Optional Dancers, Mixed Chorus, and Orchestra (text adapted from Walt Whitman; publ. AMP 1983) [includes Jubilant Song]
- The Dancing Sergeant for Band [transcription from Five Images]
- Hymns Without Words for Mixed Chorus and Orchestra (or piano) (publ. AMP 1981)
- The Psalmist's Meditation for Mixed Chorus and Piano (text from the Psalms; publ. AMP 1981) [Performance by the IU Conductor's Chorus]
- Salute to Scarlatti for Piano or Harpsichord (publ. AMP 1980)
- Sonata for Trumpet and Piano (publ. AMP 1980) [Recording by Jouko Harjanne]

1980

- Concert Variants for Piano (publ. Schirmer, 1983) [transcription of Ballabili]

1981

- Ballabili, Dances for Orchestra (publ. by Merion/Presser, 1983) [transcribed for piano as Concert Variants]
- Dreamers, for SATB div. and Piano (text by the composer; publ. E.B. Marks, 2001) [Performance by the Sunday Night Singers at the California Choral Directors Association conference]

1982

- Love Songs at Parting for Mixed Chorus and Piano (publ. Schirmer, 1984)
- Reflections On An Original Christmas Tune, for Woodwind Quintet (publ. Schirmer, 1985)

1983

- Aria and Roulade, for Concert Band (publ. Schirmer) [reworked for strings as Easthampton Sketches]

1984

- Easthampton Sketches, for String Orchestra (publ. Schirmer, 1984) [String version of Aria and Roulade]
- I Dreamed of a City Invincible for Chorus, baritone and soprano solos, and Piano/Organ (publ. Schirmer, 1985)
- Song at Springtide, for Piano Four Hands (publ. Schirmer, 1984)

1985

- The Vigil, for Chorus, Brass, and Percussion (publ. Carl Fischer)

1986

- Introduction and Fantasies On a Chorale Tune, for Piano (publ. Schirmer) [reworked as orchestral Variants on a Bach Chorale] [Performance by Debra Torok]
- Variants on a Bach Chorale [Herr Gott, dich loben alle wir], for orchestra (publ. Theodore Presser, 1990) [re-working of Introduction and Fantasies on a Chorale Tune]

1987

- Nativity for Soloists, Chorus, and Orchestra (publ. Schirmer)
- Short Intervallic Etudes (for Well-Tempered Pianists) (publ. Schirmer) [Performance by Debra Torok]
- Sing a Song Universal, for SATB chorus and piano (publ. Schirmer)
- Taxes, for Voice and Piano [from The Nativity] (publ. Schirmer)

1990

- A Proclamation "Let Us Sing a New Song", for SATB Chorus and Band (or Piano) (publ. Presser)

1991

- Metaphrase on Lines from Shakespeare, for Concert Band (publ. Merion/Presser)
- The Quest, for SATB and Piano (publ. Presser)

1994

- Fantasies On An Original Theme, for Concert Band (publ. Presser) [publisher recording]

1995

- A Memory, for TTBB Chorus and Piano (publ. Presser)
- Songs of Memory, for SATB Chorus and Piano (publ. Presser) Movements published separately: The Oak Tree, Love Song, My City

1996

- Reflections On An Ancient Hymn, for Chamber Orchestra (publ. 1998 by Carl Fischer) [Ancient hymn is In Dulci Jubilo which Dello Joio used previously for variations in Variants on a Medieval Tune; Colonial Ballads; Colonial Variants; the tune also appears TV score The Louvre, and in Scenes from the Louvre; one last setting was made for organ in 2000]

1997

- Divertimento for chamber orchestra (publ. Presser)

1998

- A Lyrical Movement, for String Orchestra (publ. Presser)

2000

- In Dulci Jubilo (setting for organ in Augsburg organ library, publ. 2000) [Giga movement from Five Lyric Pieces for Organ (Diversions), published separately as In Dulci Jubilo] [Performance by Bryan Dunnewald, St. Mark's Church, Philadelphia]

2001

- Lyrical Interludes, for String Quartet (publ. Presser)
- Simple Sketches, for piano (publ. E.B. Marks) [Performance by Debra Torok]
- Two Songs Without Words, for piano (publ. 2001 by Carl Fischer in "Masters of Today", a piano collection of works for young pianists by American Composers) [Performance by Debra Torok]

2002

- Passing Strangers for Choir (publ. E.B. Marks) [Performance by the APU Chamber Singers]

2003

- City Profiles for band (not published?) [Transcription of some movements of New York Profiles. Performance by the Keystone Wind Ensemble, Jack Stamp conducting]
