= February 1913 =

Month of 1913

<<	February 1913					>>
Su	Mo	Tu	We	Th	Fr	Sa
						1
2	3	4	5	6	7	8
9	10	11	12	13	14	15
16	17	18	19	20	21	22
23	24	25	26	27	28

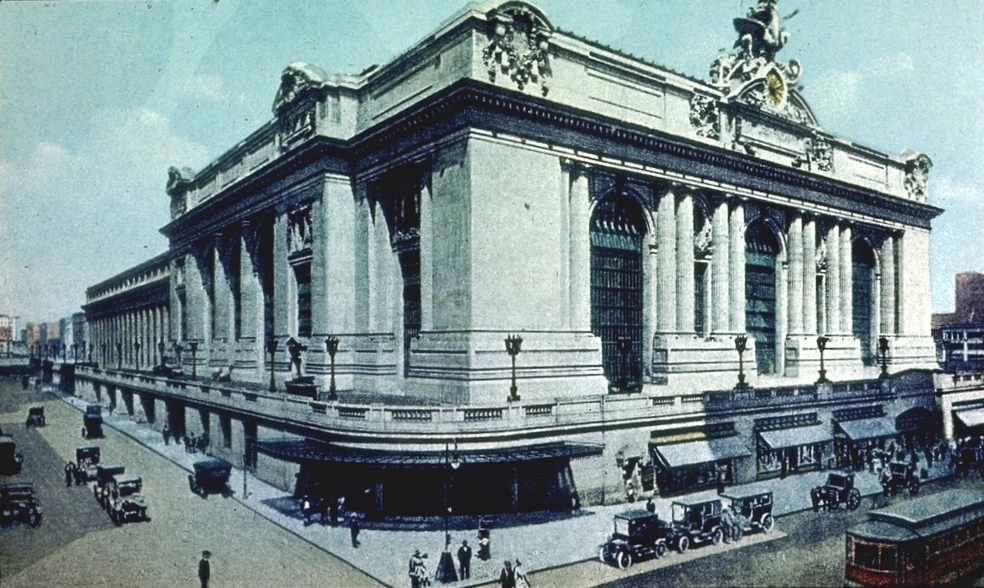
February 2, 1913: Grand Central Station opens in New York

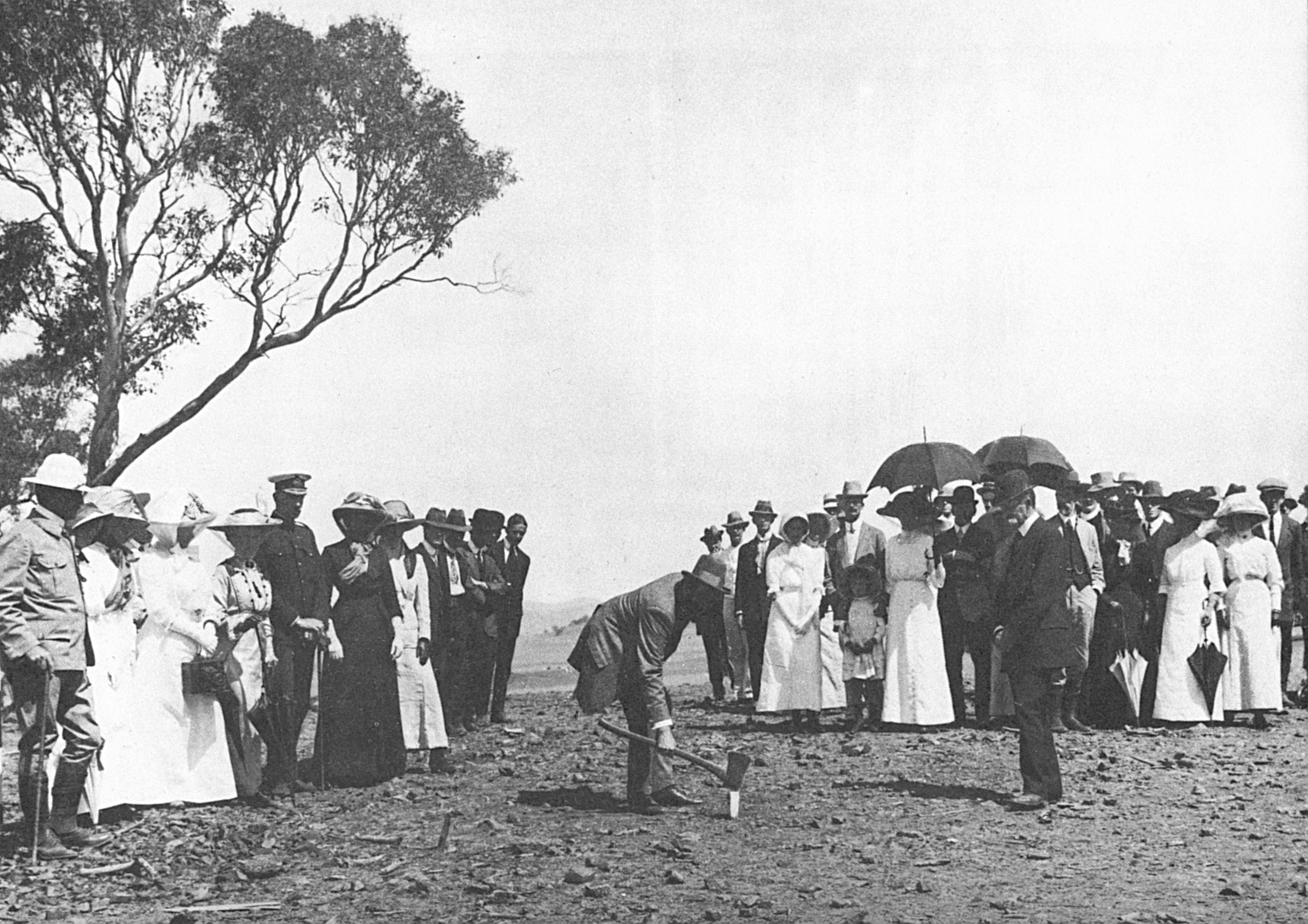
February 20, 1913: O'Malley drives the first stake for the new city of Canberra

The following events occurred in February 1913:

== February 1, 1913 (Saturday) ==
- The United States Senate voted, 47-23, in favor of amending Article II, Section 1, of the U.S. Constitution to limit American presidents to a single, six-year term. The measure for an Eighteenth Amendment to the United States Constitution was passed "by the necessary two-thirds vote and one to spare," and sent to the House for consideration.
- The Ottoman Empire accepted the terms of peace proposed by the Great Powers to end the First Balkan War.
- U.S. President William Howard Taft signed the bill authorizing the construction of a memorial to Abraham Lincoln in West Potomac Park, Washington, D.C.
- Daniel J. O'Conor and Herbert A. Faber, employees with Westinghouse Electric, filed a patent grant for a laminate as a substitute for mica used as electrical insulation. U.S. Patent No. 1,284,432 was granted on November 12, 1918. The material evolved to become Formica which is now used for many applications.

== February 2, 1913 (Sunday) ==
- The first train departed from New York City's Grand Central Terminal, having been rebuilt, opened a moment after midnight as the world's largest train station. At 12:01 am, the Boston Express No. 2 became the first train to depart, with a Mr. F. M. Lamh of Yonkers, New York credited as the first person to buy a ticket in the new terminal. On its first day, between 12:01 am and 7:00 pm, the new station attracted 150,000 visitors. "At the height of its activity, in the years just after the Second World War", one historian noted, "Grand Central served about the same number of passengers as the world's busiest airport does today, even though Grand Central uses only 1 percent as much land as the airport does."
- Rienzi Melville Johnston resigned as U.S. Senator from Texas after only four weeks in office, after having been appointed on January 4. U.S. Senator-elect Morris Sheppard took office a month ahead of schedule to complete the six-year term of Joseph Weldon Bailey, who had resigned.
- American poet Joyce Kilmer wrote his most famous poem "Trees" over an afternoon while staying at a family home overlooking the Ramapo Valley in Mahwah, New Jersey. It would be published in the August issue of Poetry later that year.

== February 3, 1913 (Monday) ==
- Fighting resumed in the First Balkan War between the Ottoman Empire and the Balkan league at two sites, Adrianople and Çatalca, after the peace talks in London broke down, and an agreed upon cease-fire expired.
- At 11:00 am local time, five minutes after the Delaware House of Representatives had received the state Senate resolution for ratification, Delaware became the 36th state to vote in favor of the Sixteenth Amendment to the United States Constitution, allowing Congress to create a federal income tax. The vote in both state houses was unanimous. With three-fourths of the 48 U.S. states having ratified the amendment, "The first change in the Federal Constitution in forty-three years was made certain." Wyoming and New Mexico voted their approval later in the day
- The German railroad car manufacturer Gothaer Waggonfabrik began an aviation division, which would create one of the first heavy bombers used in war: the Gotha twin-engine bomber that was used for bombing raids on England during World War I.
- The first Far Eastern Championship Games was held in Malate, Manila, with the Philippines, China, Japan, Siam, Malaysia, and Hong Kong participating in a precursor to the Asian Games.
- A rail station opened in Noble Park to serve the Gippsland railway line in Victoria, Australia.
- The Hippodrome opened in Aldershot, England with a billing to show variety shows twice a night. The building was eventually demolished in 1961.

== February 4, 1913 (Tuesday) ==
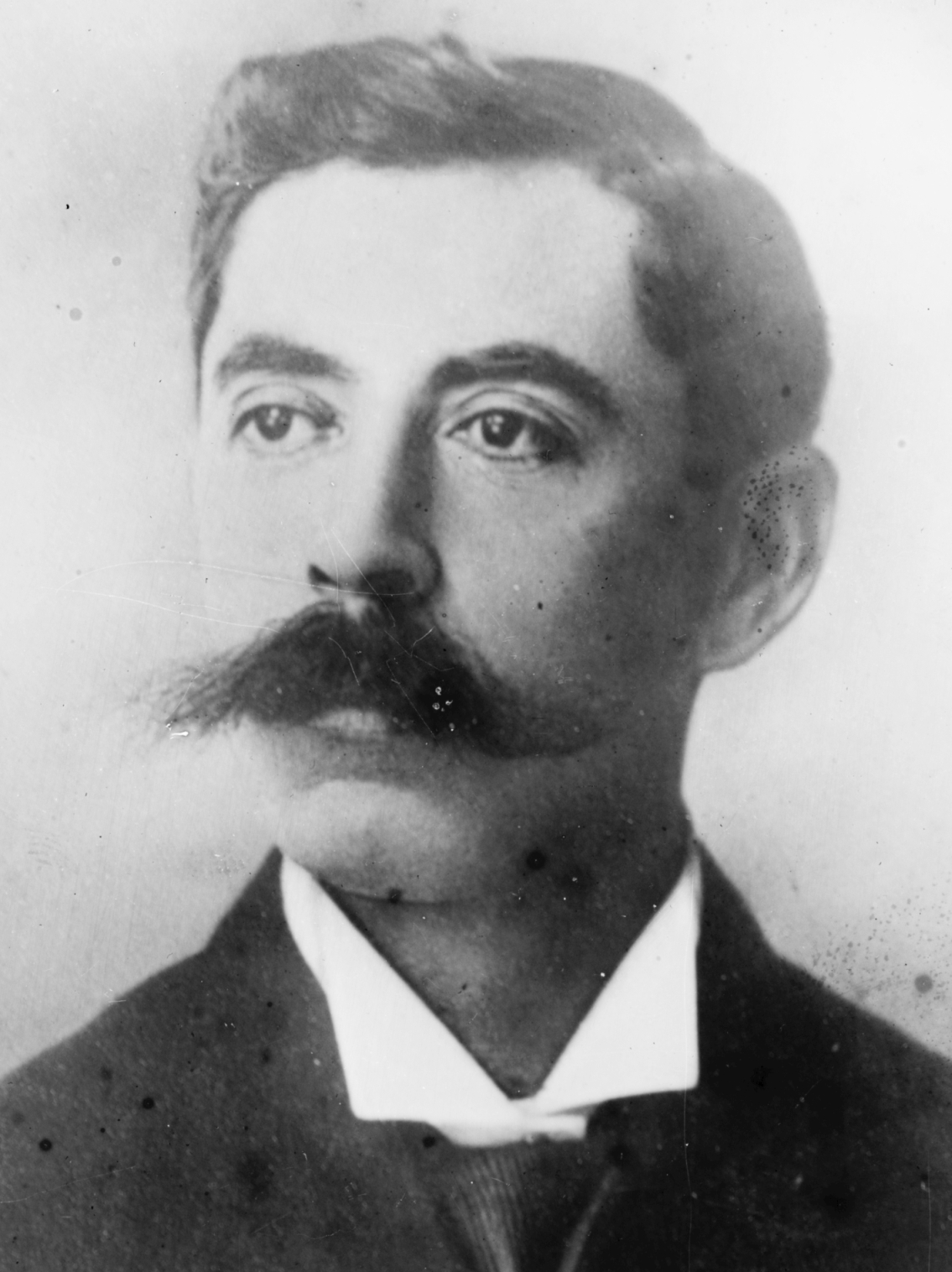
President Manuel Erique Araujo

- The President of El Salvador, Manuel Enrique Araujo, was fatally wounded by assassins, despite the initial report that none of his wounds were considered to be serious. Araujo died five days later. American warships were dispatched to Central America to stop the threat of a revolution.
- The wife of British Antarctic explorer Robert Falcon Scott departed from Los Angeles on the way to meet her husband in New Zealand. Mrs. Scott, unaware that her husband had died in Antarctica, told reporters, "I expect to meet Capt. Scott in Lytleton in March... I have not heard from my husband for about eighteen months, but I have no doubt whatsoever that he will arrive in New Zealand safely." The next day, she set off from San Francisco on the steamer Aorangi.
- Born:
  - Rosa Parks, American civil rights activist, leading figure in the Montgomery bus boycott; as Rosa McCauley, in Tuskegee, Alabama, United States (d. 2005)
  - Richard Seaman, British racing driver, 1938 German Grand Prix champion; in Chichester (killed in racing accident during the Belgian Grand Prix, 1939)
- Died: Gordon Sprigg, 82, four-time prime minister of the Cape Colony, South Africa (b. 1830)

== February 5, 1913 (Wednesday) ==
- First Lieutenant Michael Moutoussis and Ensign Aristeidis Moraitinis of the Greek Navy conducted the first aerial attack on a warship in history, dropping four bombs on Turkish ships in the Dardanelles, albeit without inflicting any casualties.
- Claudio Monteverdi's last opera, L'incoronazione di Poppea, was performed theatrically for the first time in more than 250 years, in Paris.
- Romania and Austria-Hungary signed a treaty to renew their military alliance for seven years. When World War I broke out, however, Romania would remain neutral and would later enter the war against Austria-Hungary and Germany.
- The United Kingdom's House of Commons passed the Welsh Church Disestablishment Bill.
- The National Diet of Japan voted to censure the government of Prime Minister Katsura Tarō following riots.
- Spain resumed diplomatic relations with the Vatican after a nearly three-year break. Fermin Calbeton y Planchon presented his credentials to the Pope, and then spoke with the Pontiff in the latter's private residence.
- Rail stations were added to serve the North Coast railway line in New South Wales, Australia, including Gloucester, Taree, and Wingham.
- Born: Takeo Nakasawa, Japanese mathematician, conceived the theory of matroid. His work was largely forgotten and would be rediscovered more than 60 years after his death; in Kōchi Prefecture, Empire of Japan (now Japan) (d. 1946)
- Died: Johan Ehrnrooth, 79, the fifth Prime Minister of Bulgaria for three months, from May 9 to July 13, 1881 (b. 1833)

== February 6, 1913 (Thursday) ==
- Bulgaria refused to allow foreigners to leave Adrianople in advance of the city's conquest.
- Born: Mary Leakey, British anthropologist who discovered the first Proconsul skull, a primate considered an ancestor to humans, wife of Louis Leakey; as Mary Douglas Nicol, in London, England (d. 1996)

== February 7, 1913 (Friday) ==
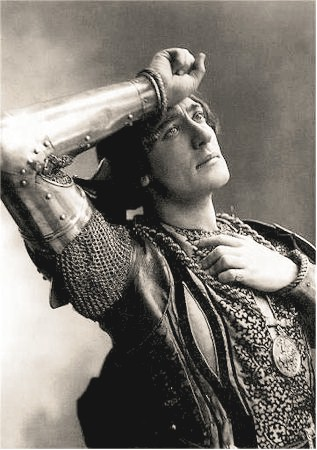
Opera singer Vanni Marcoux

- Opera singer Vanni Marcoux, baritone and star of the Boston Opera Company, was hospitalized with a concussion sustained while he had been taking his bows. Marcoux had been enjoying the thunderous applause of the audience and did not realize that he was standing directly below the heavy stage curtain as it was being lowered, and was struck on the head.
- Born: Ramón Mercader, Spanish special forces agent, known for assassinating Leon Trotsky in Mexico City under orders of the Soviet Union; as Jaime Ramón Mercader del Río, in Argentona, Spain (d. 1978)

== February 8, 1913 (Saturday) ==
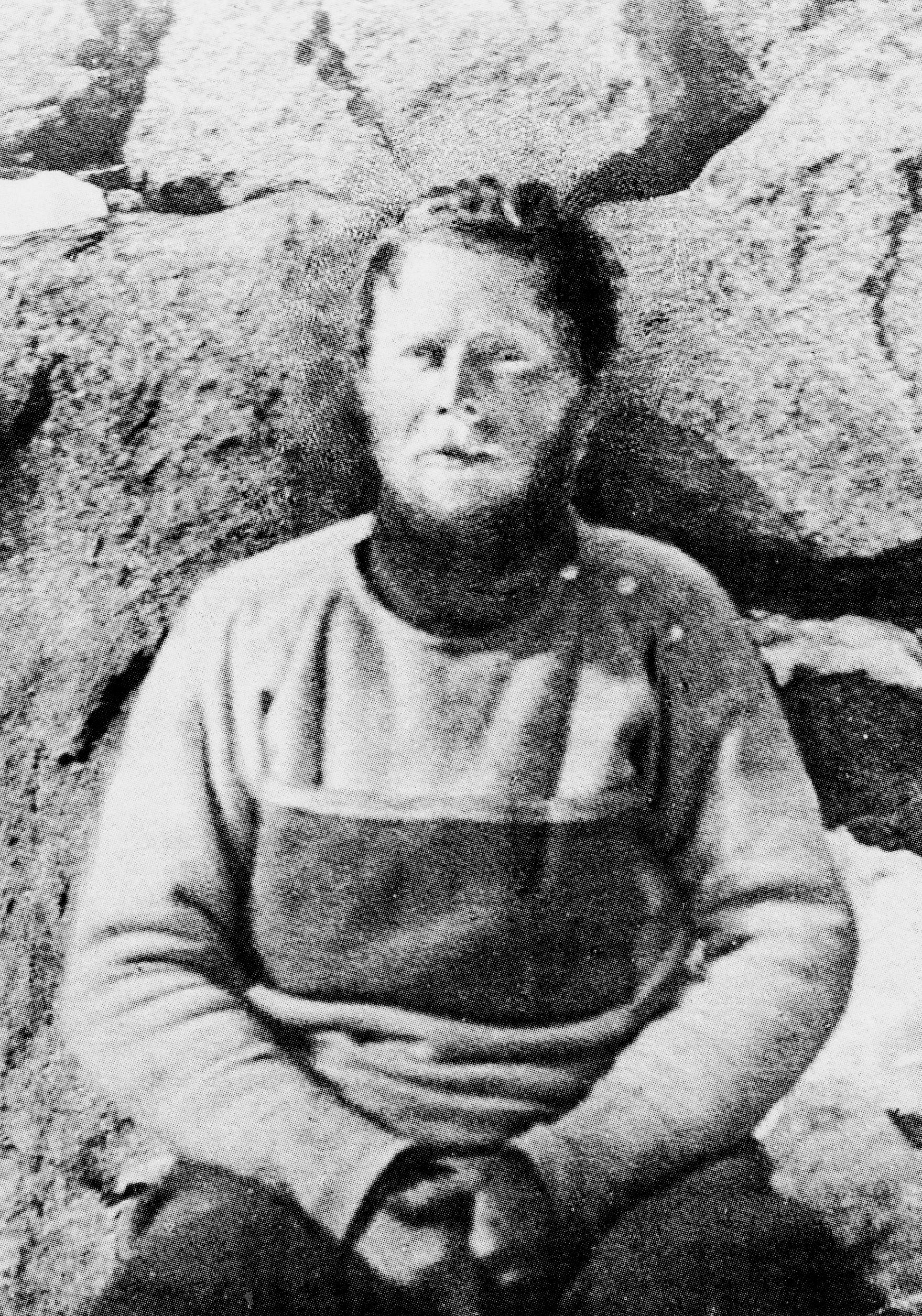
Explorer Douglas Mawson

- Explorer Douglas Mawson, the last surviving member of a three-member party of explorers on the Australasian Antarctic Expedition, made it back to the expedition's base at Cape Denison. Mawson, who had suffered frostbite and illness during his trek to the base, was informed upon his arrival that the expedition ship Aurora had departed a few hours earlier, and that another ship would not relieve the base for another year.
- Russian pilot N. de Sackoff became the first pilot shot down in combat when his biplane was hit by ground fire following a bombing run on the walls of Fort Bezhani during the First Balkan War. Flying for Greece, he came down near Preveza, on the coast north of the Ionian island of Lefkada, where he secured local Greek assistance, repaired his airplane, and flew back to base.
- The Ottoman Navy warship Asar-i Tevfik ran aground while on raid on Bulgarian ports during the First Balkan War. Despite attempts to salvage her, the ship was considered a total loss.
- At Mansfield, England, thirteen coal miners at the Bolsover Colliery were killed when a bucket with 800 US gallons (3,000 L; 670 imp gal) of water fell from a chain and crashed into the workers 500 feet (150 m) below.
- For the first time in more than 110 years, an incumbent U.S. President personally spoke before a house of the United States Congress. U.S. President William Howard Taft appeared before a session of the United States Senate to deliver a eulogy for the late Vice-President, James S. Sherman, who had died in November of 1912. "Not since 1801," The New York Times observed, "has the President spoken directly to either house of Congress." Thomas Jefferson had set the precedent of communicating to Congress by written message only, which in turn had broken the tradition set by Presidents George Washington and John Adams in speaking at the opening of Congress.
- The United States and Nicaragua signed the Wertzel-Chamorro Treaty, with the U.S. paying $3 million to Nicaragua for the option to build a canal across the nation to link the Atlantic and Pacific, and the right to set up bases on Corn Island and the Gulf of Fonseca. Construction of the Panama Canal was almost complete; the U.S. Senate's session ended before the treaty could be voted on.
- The U.S. Navy destroyer Parker was launched by William Cramp & Sons in Philadelphia. It would serve in World War I before it was decommissioned in 1922.
- What would later be called the Ten Tragic Days ("La Decena Trágica") began when Mexican Army cadets loyal to Generals Felix Diaz and Bernardo Reyes violently freed them from prison in Mexico City where they had been jailed for leading government revolts last November.
- Died: John George Brown, 81, British-American painter, known for his depictions of ordinary New York City children described as "street urchins" (b. 1831)

== February 9, 1913 (Sunday) ==
- Former General Bernardo Reyes attempted to lay siege to the presidential palace in Mexico City, but Palace Guard commander Lauro Villar Ochoa, who was dressed in civilian clothes on his way to the palace, observed Reyes' troops mobilizing to attack and was able to alert the guards in time. The resulting gun battle killed 400 soldiers and civilians and injured 1,000, including Reyes, who was shot off his mount as he led the attack on horseback. President Francisco I. Madero heard of the attack from his residence 3 miles (4.8 km) away and tried to get to the presidential palace but was stopped short. He then met with General Victoriano Huerta and appointed him commander of the federal army in the nation's capital. Meanwhile, Felix Diaz took control of the main armory outside Mexico City.
- At 9:05 pm, hundreds of people in Toronto observed a series of brilliant meteors streaking across the sky. The procession, first visible in the skies above Mortlach, Saskatchewan, moved south-easterly across North America. It was observed by Col. W. R. Winter from a position on Bermuda. It was reported by seven ships at sea, and then last reported off the eastern tip of Brazil near Cape Sao Roque. On the following day, witnesses to the event inundated Professor Clarence Chant, of the Astronomy Department of the University of Toronto, who had not observed the procession, with phone calls and letters. Chant systematically plotted the path of the procession and reported his findings in a 73-page report tabled in the May–June 1913 edition of the Journal of the Royal Astronomical Society of Canada. A witness to the event was Toronto artist Gustav Hahn, who made a painting following his observation. This event is also known as the "Cyrillids" because the event happened on St. Cyril's Day. In 2000, author Patrick Moore would write, "Nothing similar had ever been seen before, and nothing similar has been seen since."
- The inaugural football match for the Campo de O'Donnell stadium was played between Madrid and Bilbao, with the host team defeated 4-0. The stadium had the same name as the stadium for local rivals Real Madrid, which was situated 200 metres (660 ft) away on the same boulevard of Calle de O'Donnell.

== February 10, 1913 (Monday) ==
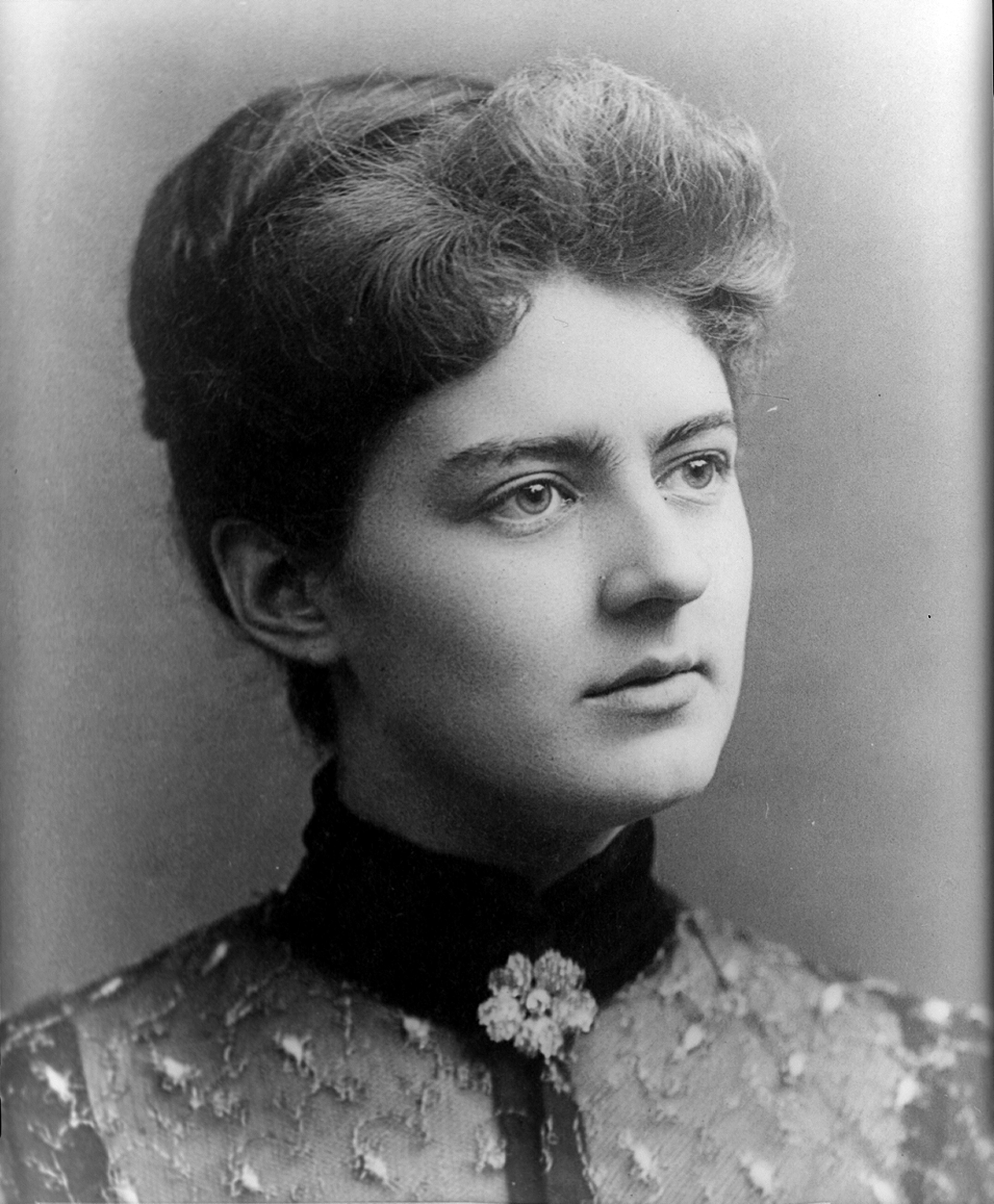
Frances Cleveland

- The world learned the fate of Robert Falcon Scott and the other members of his Antarctic exploration team who had perished after reaching the South Pole. The news was brought with the return of the Terra Nova.
- Irish nationalist and Member of Parliament John Redmond opened the replacement city bridge over the River Suir in Waterford, Ireland that will eventually be named after him.
- Charles Rumney Samson, who had been the first person to fly an airplane off of the deck of a ship on May 9, 1912, became the first person to fire a machine gun from an airplane in flight. Samson flew over Eastchurch, England.
- At Mucklow, West Virginia, 16 people, 12 miners and 4 mine guards, were killed in fighting between striking coal miners and police.
- Former First Lady of the United States Frances Cleveland became the first President's widow to remarry. The widow of Grover Cleveland, who had died in 1908, was wed to Professor Thomas J. Preston Jr. of Princeton University. The only other widow of a U.S. President to remarry would be Jacqueline Kennedy, who would marry Aristotle Onassis in 1968.
- A rail station opened in Thornton to serve the Main North railway line in New South Wales, Australia.
- The play Romance by American dramatist Edward Sheldon premiered at Maxine Elliott's Theatre in New York City and ran for 160 performances.
- Born: Douglas Slocombe, British cinematographer, best known for his work on first three Indiana Jones films; as Ralph Douglas Vladimir Slocombe, in London, England (d. 2016)

== February 11, 1913 (Tuesday) ==
- The Taishō political crisis began in Japan, when Prime Minister Katsura Tarō and his cabinet resigned, the day after tens of thousands of protesters surrounded the Parliament Building.
- General Victoriano Huerta began his assault on the armory where Felix Diaz and his rebels were embedded, but the group had access to sufficient weapons to respond that resulted in much of Mexico City being damaged by bombardment. American diplomat Henry Lane Wilson, ambassador to Mexico, informed the White House that the Mexican government had fallen.
- Five West Virginia state legislators were arrested on charges of accepting bribes in advance of a vote on the state's U.S. Senator. The six were charged with receiving a total of $20,000 to vote in favor of Senate candidate William Seymour Edwards. Two days later, another six were indicted and "Every member of the West Virginia Legislature, save those against whom indictments have been returned" was issued a summons to appear before a special grand jury.
- Franz Schuhmeier, a Socialist member of the Austrian parliament, was assassinated at a railway station in Vienna. His killer, Paul Kunschak, was the brother of one of Schuhmeier's opponents in the Chamber of Deputies, a member of the Christian Socialist Party. Schuhmeier, who had led the fight for universal suffrage in Austria, was mourned by 250,000 people.
- The Roman Catholic dioceses of San Miguel and Santa Ana were established in El Salvador.
- The Caledonian football club was established in Bassendean, Australia.
- Born: Masaji Kiyokawa, Japanese swimmer, gold medalist at the 1932 Summer Olympics and bronze medalist at the 1936 Summer Olympics; in Toyohashi, Japanese Empire (now Japan) (d. 1999)

== February 12, 1913 (Wednesday) ==
- Yamamoto Gonnohyōe became the new Prime Minister of Japan. The new premier, 60 years old, was a graduate of the United States Naval Academy at Annapolis, Maryland, in the Class of 1877.
- The electoral votes were canvassed in a joint session of the United States Congress, and Woodrow Wilson was officially proclaimed as the winner of the election.

== February 13, 1913 (Thursday) ==
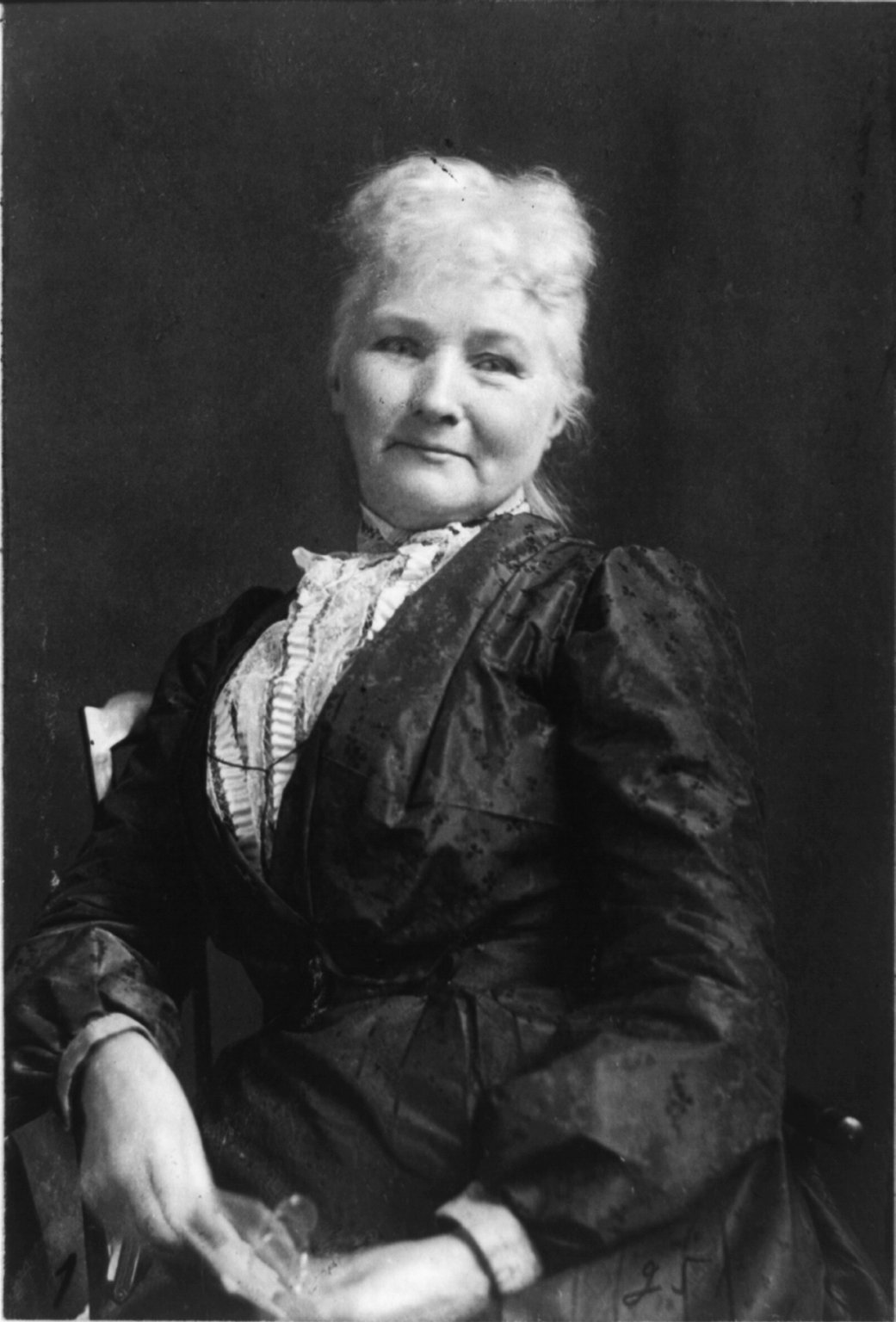
Mary Harris "Mother" Jones

- With the battle between government troops and rebels in Mexico City seemingly going nowhere, American diplomat Henry Lane Wilson suggested to Mexican foreign minister Pedro Lascuráin that President Francisco I. Madero should resign to stop further bloodshed.
- The 13th Dalai Lama, Thubten Gyatso, declares independence of Tibet from China's Qing dynasty.
- The United States and France signed a five-year extension of their arbitration treaty.
- Mary Harris Jones, the 83-year-old labor activist remembered as "Mother Jones", was arrested in Charleston, West Virginia after leading a group of miners to confront Governor William E. Glasscock. Transported to an area of Charleston that was under martial law because of confrontations between striking coal miners and company police, Jones would be tried by a military court in March, on charges of conspiracy to commit murder. Convicted on the charges, she would be sentenced to three years imprisonment, but released by the new Governor after 85 days.
- Woodrow Wilson announced his resignation as Governor of New Jersey, effective March 1, three days before he was to take office as the President of the United States.
- Norwegian sailing ship Pisagua became stranded on Low Island in the South Shetland Islands off Antarctica where she was declared a total loss.
- The Bank of New Brunswick merged with the Bank of Nova Scotia, after over 90 years as one of the largest pre-Confederation banks in Canada.
- The French-language play La Demoiselle de magasin by Belgian dramatists Frantz Fonson and Fernand Wicheler premiered at Théâtre du Gymnase in Paris. An English version title Along Came Ruth premiered a year later at the Gaiety Theatre in New York City.
- Born:
  - Khalid, Saudi noble, fourth King of Saudi Arabia; in Riyadh, Emirate of Riyadh (now Saudi Arabia) (d. 1982)
  - Frank Tashlin, American film director and animator, known for films including The Girl Can't Help It and children's books such as The Bear That Wasn't; as Francis Fredrick von Taschlein, in Weehawken, New Jersey, United States (d. 1972)

== February 14, 1913 (Friday) ==
- Outgoing U.S. President William Howard Taft vetoed the Burnett-Dillingham Immigration Bill, that would have turned away immigrant heads of families who were unable to pass a literacy test. The veto would survive an attempt at an override; a historian would note later that, "Following his conscience and the advice of Charles Nagel, [Taft] defended his long-standing belief that immigration was an economic boon to the country and that Southern and Eastern Europeans could assimilate as readily as Northern and Western Europeans... Taft left the gates of America open for many immigrants as he left the White House."
- The estate of Swedish writer and poet Lotten von Kræmer, who passed the previous year, established the literary society Samfundet De Nio (The Nine Society) in Stockholm.
- Born:
  - Jimmy Hoffa, American labor leader, president of the International Brotherhood of Teamsters from 1957 to 1971; as James Riddle Hoffa, in Brazil, Indiana, United States (disappeared 1975, declared dead 1982)
  - James Pike, American religious leader, Bishop of the Episcopal Diocese of California; in Oklahoma City, Oklahoma, United States (d. 1969)
  - Woody Hayes, American football coach at Denison University, Miami University, and Ohio State University from 1946 to 1978; as Wayne Woodrow Hayes, in Clifton, Ohio, United States (d. 1987)
  - Mel Allen, American sportscaster, play announcer for the New York Yankees from 1940s to 1960s; as Melvin Allen Israel, in Birmingham, Alabama, United States (d. 1996)
- Died: Stewart L. Woodford, 88, American diplomat, foreign minister to Spain at the time of the Spanish–American War (b. 1835)

== February 15, 1913 (Saturday) ==
- China's Minister of Education opened the Conference on Unification of Pronunciation, the first attempt to create common standards for the Chinese language, with 44 delegates meeting in Beijing.
- The Welsh Church Disestablishment Bill was rejected by the British House of Lords, with only 52 in favor and 252 against.
- Emilio Vasquez Gomez crossed the U.S.-Mexican border at Columbus, New Mexico, into Palomas, and proclaimed himself as President of Mexico, with plans to journey to the capital to take office.
- Former Venezuelan President Cipriano Castro was permitted entry into the United States by federal court order.
- Theatrical producer Barry Jackson opened the Birmingham Repertory Theatre in Birmingham, England with a production of the William Shakespeare play Twelfth Night. It is now the home of the Old Rep theater company.
- Future comedic film star Harold Lloyd made his screen debut in an uncredited role in the film The Old Monk's Tale.
- Born: Erich Eliskases, Austrian chess player, 1952 Grandmaster; in Innsbruck, Austria-Hungary (now Austria) (d. 1997)

== February 16, 1913 (Sunday) ==
- West of Pierre, South Dakota, Hattie May Foster, a 14-year-old student, spotted the corner of a lead marker sticking out of the ground and unearthed it. What Foster had located was a marker that had been set 170 years earlier by a team of French explorers under the command of Pierre Gaultier de La Vérendrye and François de La Vérendrye, who had marked the furthest point explored by them before they began their journey home. Inscribed on one side was "Anno XXVI Regni Ludovici XV Prorege; Illustrissimo Domino Domino Marchione; De Beauharnois M D CC XXXXI; Petrus Gaultier de Laverendrie Posvit", and on the other "Pose par le Chevalier de Lavr to jo Louy la Londette Amiotte, Le 30 de mars 1743" (March 30, 1743).
- Relief forces under command of Aureliano Blanquet arrived in Mexico City but refused to fight for the Mexican government, allowing a nine-hour armistice to go into effect in Mexico City.
- Joseph Hertz of New York City was elected as Chief Rabbi of the United Hebrew Congregations of the British Empire. He received 298 votes against 39 for Moses Hyamson.

== February 17, 1913 (Monday) ==
- U.S. President William Howard Taft assured Mexican President Francisco I. Madero that the United States had no plans to intervene in the Mexican Revolution other than to protect U.S. citizens.
- The "Armory Show", officially the first International Exhibition of Modern Art, opened in New York City at the Sixty-ninth Regiment Armory, at the corner of Lexington Avenue and 26th Street. The exhibition, which would last until March 15, featured 1,250 paintings, sculptures and decorative works from over 300 European and American masters, including Marcel Duchamp's Nude Descending a Staircase, No. 2. Other artists who were represented were Pablo Picasso, Paul Cézanne, Wassily Kandinsky, Henri Matisse, Claude Monet and Vincent van Gogh. American artists were James Abbott McNeill Whistler, Edward Hopper, Childe Hassam, Mary Cassatt, and George Bellows. The Armory Show was the first major exhibition in the United States of modern art and would be called by art historian Hélène Seckel as "the relaunching, if not actually the birth, of the art market," with wealthy collectors being inspired to acquire the work of modern artists.
- Died:
  - Edward Stanley Gibbons, 72, English philatelist, founder of Stanley Gibbons (b. 1840)
  - Joaquin Miller, 75, American poet, known for poems about his experiences in the frontier including his book, Songs of the Sierras (b. 1837)

== February 18, 1913 (Tuesday) ==
- After ten day of fighting against rebels, federal troops under command of General Aureliano Blanquet in Mexico City arrested President Francisco I. Madero and Vice-President José María Pino Suárez. The President and Vice-President both resigned at 10:24 pm, and Foreign Minister Pedro Lascuráin, second in line for succession, became the interim President. When the Mexican Congress confirmed General Victoriano Huerta as the new leader, President Lascuráin resigned at 11:20 pm, having served for 56 minutes.
- Born: Artur Axmann, German army officer, leader of the Hitler Youth from 1940 to 1945; in Hagen, Kingdom of Prussia, German Empire (now Germany) (d. 1996)
- Died:
  - George Washington Custis Lee, 80, American educator as president of Washington and Lee University, son of Robert E. Lee (b. 1832)
  - George Lewis Becke, 57, Australian writer, known for his story collections By Reef and Palm and Ebbing of the Tide (b. 1855)

== February 19, 1913 (Wednesday) ==
- Gustavo A. Madero, brother of the deposed President, was executed on orders of General Félix Díaz. Gustavo was "subjected to the 'fugitive law'," where prisoners were released and given a chance to flee while guns were fired at them.
- An attempt to override U.S. President William Howard Taft's veto of the Immigration Bill failed in the House by five votes, after having passed the Senate, 72–18, the day before. Although the vote was 213–114 in favor of overcoming the President's veto, two-thirds (218) of the 327 representatives present were required to agree.
- A house being built for British cabinet minister David Lloyd George near Walton Heath Golf Club in Surrey, England was fire bombed, allegedly by British suffragists. Suffragist leader Emmeline Pankhurst later claimed during a speech in Cardiff that evening to have incited the incident as well as other arson attacks throughout England.

== February 20, 1913 (Thursday) ==
- The first survey stake for what would become the city of Canberra, capital of Australia, was driven into the ground by King O'Malley, the Minister for Home Affairs.
- The most destructive fire in Tokyo, in almost 60 years, broke out at a Salvation Army hall in the Kanda district, spread over one-half of a square mile, and destroyed 1,500 homes and buildings.
- Mexico's "Ten Tragic Days" closed as the last day of fighting against rebel forces ended when mounted police stormed the armory and were cut down by machine gun fire, resulting in 67 dead and wounded. In total, 5,500 people were killed or wounded in the ten days of fighting.
- Steel manufacturer Hesteel Serbia began operations as SARTID in Belgrade. The company went bankrupt and languished in the 2000s until it was purchased and revived by the Hesteel Group in 2016.
- The North Portland Library opened in Portland, Oregon.
- Born:
  - Tommy Henrich, American baseball player, right-fielder and first baseman for the New York Yankees from 1937 to 1950, five-time World Series champion; as Thomas Henrich, in Massillon, Ohio, United States (d. 2009)
  - Mary Durack, Australian writer, author of Kings in Grass Castles; in Adelaide, South Australia (d. 1994)

== February 21, 1913 (Friday) ==
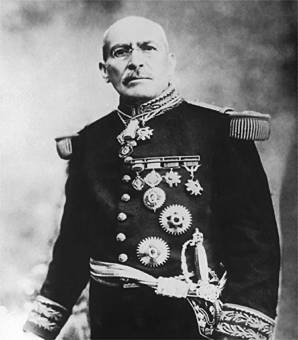
Mexican President Victoriano Huerta.

- Four days after their forced resignations, former Mexican President Francisco I. Madero, and Vice-President José María Pino Suárez were shot to death after being transported from the presidential palace to a prison. The official explanation by current President Victoriano Huerta was that the two men were being transported in automobiles and "two-thirds of the way to the penitentiary, they were attacked by an armed group...and the prisoners tried to escape. An exchange of shots then took place in which one of the attacking party was killed, two were wounded and both prisoners killed." One account said that Major Francisco Cardenas, who was escorting the prisoners, shot both men, while another account claimed that U.S. Ambassador Henry Lane Wilson told President Huerta to do "whatever he thought best for the country," after which Huerta had the two men executed in the prison. The subsequent government investigation "resulted in a decision that no one could be held legally responsible."
- Harcourt Butler, the Secretary of State for Education in British India, specified the goals for creating 14 universities across India.
- Arkansas outlawed the practice of convict leasing, after the state legislature had passed a bill proposed by Governor George Washington Donaghey and signed by Donaghey's successor, Joseph Taylor Robinson.
- U.S. District Judge Nathan Goff Jr. was elected as U.S. Senator for West Virginia by the state legislature, with 49 votes, compared to 14 votes for the three other candidates.
- Born: Benjamin Bloom, American psychologist who developed the concept of mastery learning and Bloom's Taxonomy; in Lansford, Pennsylvania, United States (d. 1999)

== February 22, 1913 (Saturday) ==
- U.S. President William Howard Taft dispatched 4,000 men to Galveston, Texas, for a possible deployment to Mexico. The force was increased two days later to 10,000 people.
- Edward Stonewall Jackson McAllister, leader of the Democratic Party of Oregon, was convicted by a jury for sodomy, wrapping months of scandal when a police investigation uncovered a gay male subculture in Portland, Oregon. McAllister and two other prominent men appealed and had their conviction reversed by the Oregon Supreme Court in May.
- Minister of Public Instruction Campbell Carmichael officially opened Parramatta High School was established in Sydney, Australia.
- The United States Naval Academy, which would later be ranked by the Helms Athletic Foundation as the best team of the 1912-13 men's basketball season, closed its schedule with a 67-18 win over Georgetown University and a 9-0 finish. The Midshipmen outscored their opponents 501-187 in nine games, defeating them by an average of 35 points per game.
- Born: Ranko Marinković, Croatian writer, known for dramatic works including Glorija; in Komiža, Kingdom of Dalmatia, Austria-Hungary (now Croatia) (d. 2001)
- Died:
  - Empress Dowager Longyu, 45, Chinese noble, widow of the Guangxu Emperor and former co-regent for China's last emperor, Puyi (b. 1868)
  - Ferdinand de Saussure, 55, Swiss linguist who pioneered structural linguistics (b. 1857)

== February 23, 1913 (Sunday) ==
- Romania agreed to a mediation of its boundary dispute with Bulgaria.
- Joseph Stalin was arrested by the Russian secret police agency, the Okhrana, upon his arrival at the Kalashnikov Exchange at Saint Petersburg, where International Women's Day was being celebrated. The future dictator of the Soviet Union, Stalin would be imprisoned for the next four years by the Tsarist government, until his release in 1917 a few months before the Russian Revolution.
- The United Synagogue of America held its initial meeting, at which time it changed to its present name from the working title of "Agudath Jeshurun- A Union for Promoting Traditional Judaism in America."
- The comic strip Hawkshaw the Detective by Gus Mager made its debut.
- Inez Townsend's Snooks and Snicks, the Mischievous Twins makes its debut and ran until 4 July 1915.
- Sports club Eiðis Bóltfelag was established Eiði, Eysturoy on the Faroe Islands, the oldest club on the island.
- Born: Sabine Sicaud, French girl poet who published Poèmes d'Enfant at 13 and died at age 15; in Villeneuve-sur-Lot, France (d. 1928)

== February 24, 1913 (Monday) ==
- The first radio transmission from Antarctica was made, with Australasian Expedition leader Douglas Mawson telegraphing a message by wireless to Australia.
- USS Plunger, one of the earliest submarines of the United States Navy, was struck from the Naval Vessel Register after it was decommissioned. It was later sold as scrap in 1922.
- The town of Capelinha, Brazil was established.
- Born:
  - Richard M. Goodwin, American mathematician and economist, developer of the Goodwin model; in New Castle, Indiana, United States (d. 1996)
  - Kai Holst, Norwegian seaman, partisan, leader of the Milorg resistance against German occupation during World War II; in Lillehammer, Norway (executed, 1945)

== February 25, 1913 (Tuesday) ==
- United States Secretary of State Philander C. Knox proclaimed that the Sixteenth Amendment to the United States Constitution had been ratified by the necessary three-fourths of the states, officially making a federal income tax part of the Constitution. An 1894 attempt by the U.S. government to tax incomes had been found unconstitutional, except as regards salaries and wages. The first federal income tax laws passed, after the Amendment took effect, provided for a rate of one percent for incomes of $20,000 or less
- José Enrique Varela resigned as Prime Minister of Peru.
- The opera Cyrano, adapted from the famous French play Cyrano de Bergerac by composer Walter Damrosch, premiered at the Metropolitan Opera in New York City with Pasquale Amato as Cyrano, Frances Alda as Roxane, and Alfred Hertz conducting.
- Born:
  - Jim Backus, American actor, best known as the voice of "Mr. Magoo" and Thurston Howell III in the 1960s television sitcom Gilligan's Island; as James Backus, in Cleveland, Ohio, United States (d. 1989)
  - Gert Fröbe, German actor, best known for portraying the title character in Goldfinger; asKarl Gerhart Fröbe, in Oberplanitz (now part of Zwickau), German Empire (now Germany) (d. 1988)
- Died: Jake DeRosier, 32, Canadian motorcycle racer, winner of the 1911 Isle of Man Tourist Trophy, of complications from surgeries for an accident in 1912 (b. 1880)

== February 26, 1913 (Wednesday) ==
- Federico Luna Peralta became the new Prime Minister of Peru.
- The Royal Flying Corps established the first operational military airfield for fixed-wing aircraft in the United Kingdom at Montrose in Scotland.
- Born:
  - George Barker, British poet, member of the New Apocalyptics movement; in Loughton, England (d. 1991)
  - Hermann Lenz, German writer, best known for the Eugen-Rapp series roughly based on his own life and his correspondences to Romanian-German poet Paul Celan and Austrian novelist Peter Handke; in Stuttgart, German Empire (now Germany) (d. 1998)
- Died:
  - Felix Draeseke, 77, German composer, member of the New German School (b. 1835)
  - Bud Fowler, 54, American baseball player, the earliest known African-American to play professional baseball for an all-white team, 2022 inductee to the Baseball Hall of Fame (b. 1858)

== February 27, 1913 (Thursday) ==
- The concept of the "isotope," referring to a variation of a chemical element containing the same number of protons but a different number of neutrons, was introduced by British radiochemist Frederick Soddy, in a February 27 address before Britain's Royal Society, when he referred to "atoms of the same chemical properties, non-separable by any known process." The term itself, suggested to Soddy by his friend, Edinburgh physician Margaret Todd, would not be introduced until December 4, when he used it in the British scientific journal Nature.
- Born:
  - Irwin Shaw, American writer, known for novels including The Young Lions and Rich Man, Poor Man; as Irwin Gilbert Shamforoff, in New York City, United States (d. 1984)
  - T. B. Ilangaratne, Sri Lankan cabinet minister for the Sirimavo Bandaranaike administration; as Navaratne Rajakaruna Wasala Mudiyanselage Tikiri Bandara Ilangaratne, in Hataraliyadda, Ceylon (d. 1992)
  - Paul Ricœur, French philosopher who developed hermeneutic phenomenology; as Jean Paul Gustave Ricœur, in Valence, Drôme, France (d. 2005)
- Died: William Henry White, 68, British ship engineer, designer for the Royal Navy (b. 1845)

== February 28, 1913 (Friday) ==
- At least 20 people were killed in a fire at the Dewey Hotel in Omaha, Nebraska, United States.
- Proof of the existence of the pygmy hippopotamus (Choeropsis liberiensis) was demonstrated by German animal merchant Carl Hagenbeck in Liberia. After "having made sure that the species was much less rare than he had thought," Hagenbeck shot and killed one. The next day, he would capture a live pygmy hippo.
- The largest pinniped ever recorded was a southern elephant seal (Mirounga leonina), killed at Possession Bay of South Georgia Island, more than 22 feet in length and weighing almost 9,000 pounds.
- The Webb-Kenyon bill, prohibiting the interstate shipment of alcohol into dry territory for purposes of resale, passed by the House and the Senate, was vetoed by U.S. President William Howard Taft. The veto would be overridden the same day by the Senate, and the next day by the House.
- The garment workers' strike ended in New York City.
- Born: David Hawkins, American philosopher, known for his theses A Causal Interpretation of Probability and the official history of the Manhattan Project; in El Paso, Texas, United States (d. 2002)
