= Charlotte Lewis (disambiguation) =

Charlotte Lewis (born 1967) is an English actress.

Charlotte Lewis may also refer to:

- Charlotte Lewis (basketball) (1955–2007), American basketball player
- Charlotte Lewis (artist) (1934–1999), American artist
- Charlotte Lewis (Lost), character on the television series Lost
