= March 1913 =

Month of 1913

<<	March 1913					>>
Su	Mo	Tu	We	Th	Fr	Sa
						1
2	3	4	5	6	7	8
9	10	11	12	13	14	15
16	17	18	19	20	21	22
23	24	25	26	27	28	29
30	31

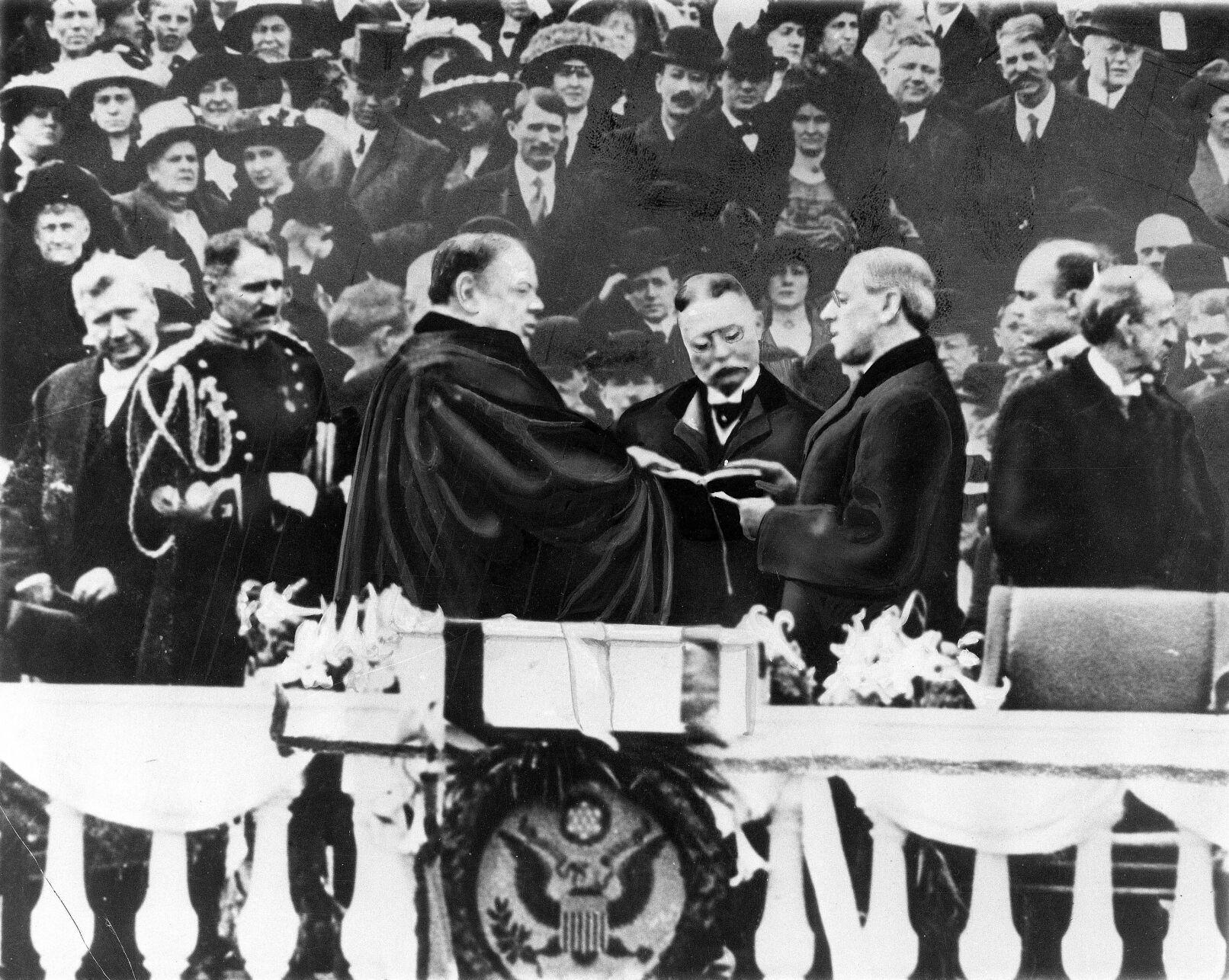
March 4, 1913: Woodrow Wilson inaugurated as U.S. President

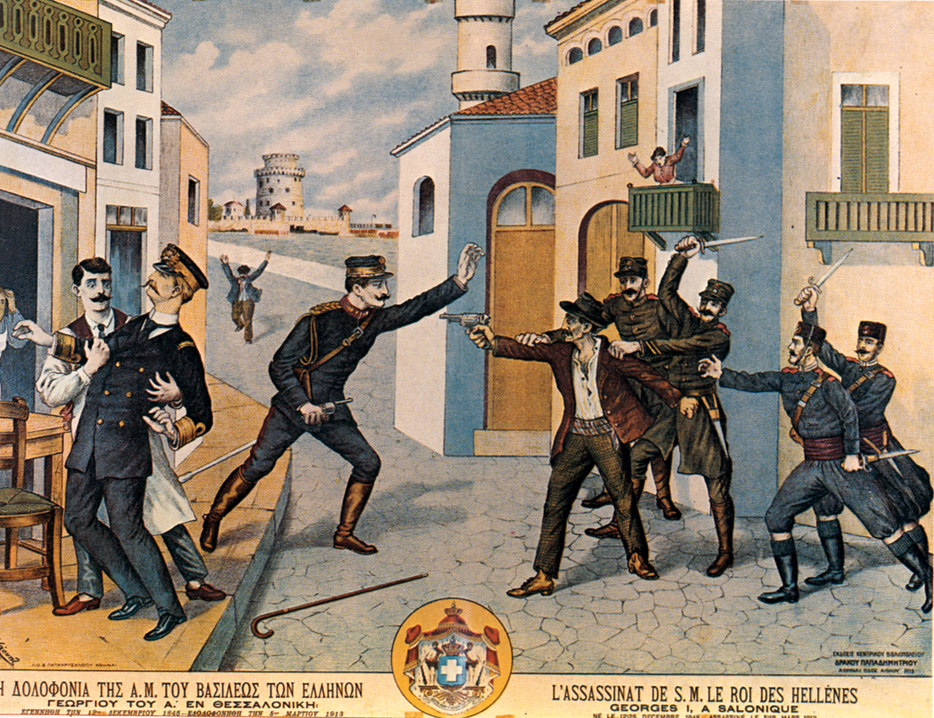
March 18, 1913: King George of Greece assassinated

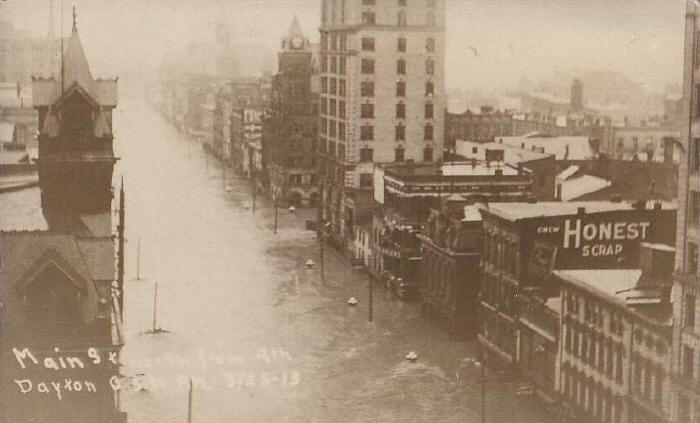
March 25, 1913: Flood kills 400 people in and around Dayton, Ohio

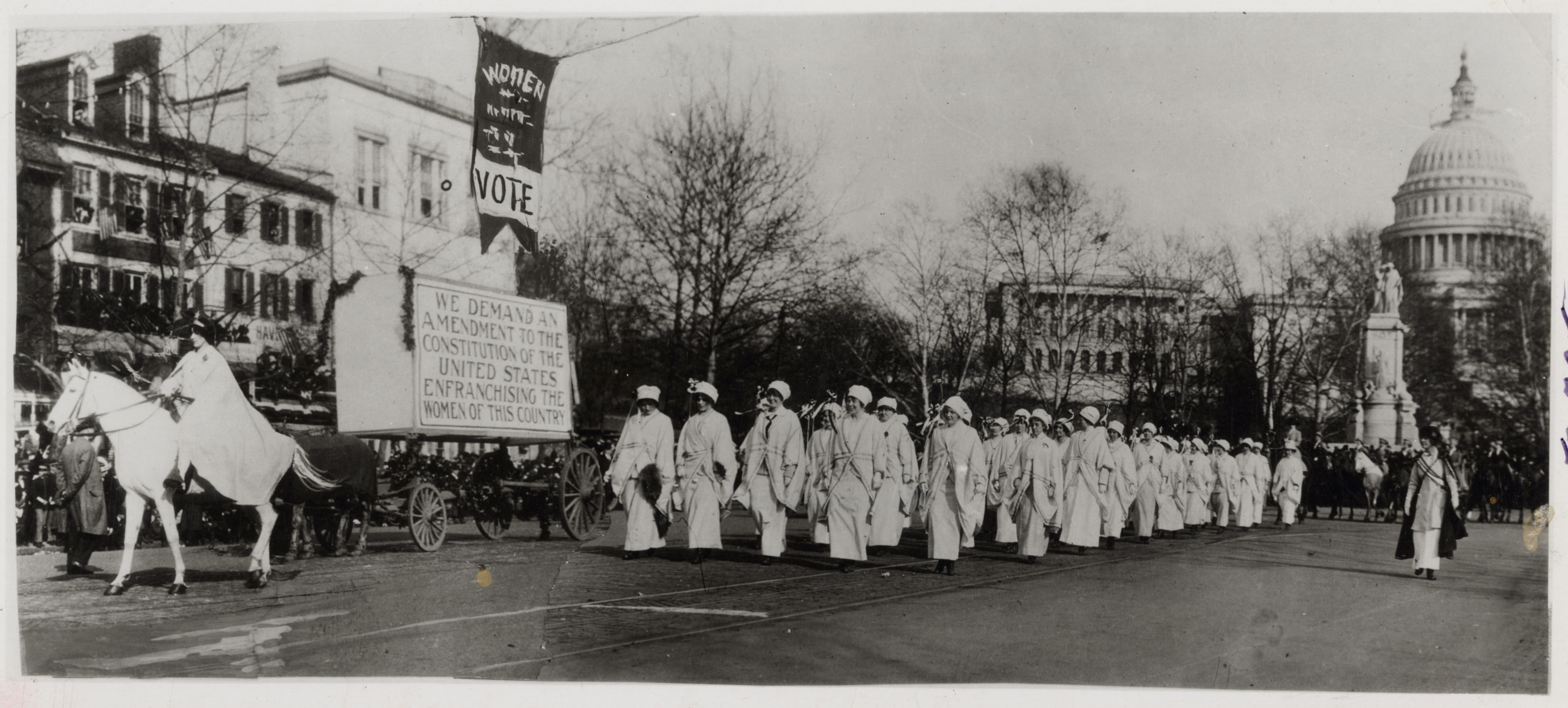
March 3, 1913: Inez Millholland leads the Woman Suffragemarch on Pennsylvania Avenue.

The following events occurred in March 1913:

== March 1, 1913 (Saturday) ==
- Former members of the Macedonian Scientific and Literary Society released a memorandum to the European powers advocating for the independence of the historic region of Macedonia from the Ottoman Empire.
- The German Navy dreadnought König, first of a new line of ships with the capacity to fire 30.5cm (12 inch) shells, was launched by Wilhelmshaven Imperial Shipyard in Wilhelmshaven, Germany.
- The British steamer Calvados, with 200 passengers and crew, was lost in the Sea of Marmara off of the coast of Turkey, while traveling in a blizzard between Istanbul and Panderma.
- New Jersey Governor Woodrow Wilson resigned three days before his scheduled inauguration as President of the United States. Wilson was succeeded by State Senate President James Fairman Fielder.
- The Vermont Square Branch Library opened in Los Angeles thanks to funding from the Carnegie Foundation. It was added to the National Register of Historic Places in 1987.
- Sports club AHC Quick was established in Amsterdam, and became known as one of the oldest running baseball and softball clubs in all of Europe.
- Born:
  - Ralph Ellison, African-American writer, author of Invisible Man and Shadow and Act; in Oklahoma City, United States (d. 1994)
  - R. S. R. Fitter, British naturalist, leading expert and author on wildflowers; as Richard Sidney Richmond Fitter, in London, England (d. 2005)
  - Helmut Gernsheim, German photographer, known for his wartime and postwar photo work; in Munich, German Empire (now Germany) (d. 1995)
- Died: Mario Pieri, 52, Italian mathematician, known for his work on foundations of geometry, died from cancer (b. 1860)

== March 2, 1913 (Sunday) ==
- Soldiers of the 9th U.S. Cavalry, stationed in Douglas, Arizona, traded gunfire with Mexican Army troops who were across the border in Agua Prieta, in a skirmish between the border patrols of both nations. Reportedly, four Mexican federal soldiers were killed, and some of the U.S. Army soldiers charged across the border into Mexico to pursue the retreating Mexican troops.

== March 3, 1913 (Monday) ==
- The Woman Suffrage Procession took place in Washington D.C. with a group of 8,000 marchers organized by Alice Paul of the National American Woman Suffrage Association. The marchers, mostly women led by suffragist Inez Milholland on horseback, paraded down Pennsylvania Avenue on the eve of the U.S. presidential inauguration, to rally in support of granting women the right to vote in the United States.
- A statue of American historian Edward Everett Hale was installed in the Public Garden of Boston.
- The Bulgarian soccer football club Cherno More Varna was established in Varna, Bulgaria.

== March 4, 1913 (Tuesday) ==
- Woodrow Wilson was inaugurated as the 28th President of the United States at 1:34 pm, 94 minutes after the expiration of the term of President William Howard Taft.
- Hours before leaving office, outgoing U.S. President William Howard Taft signed legislation creating the United States Department of Labor. The former Department of Commerce and Labor was renamed as the United States Department of Commerce. Taft's signing came with a statement: "I think that nine departments are enough for the proper administration of the government."
- The opera Pénélope by composer Gabriel Fauré premiered at the Opéra de Monte-Carlo in Monte Carlo, and then over a month later at the Théâtre des Champs-Élysées in Paris.
- Born: John Garfield, American film actor, known for his film roles in Four Daughters, The Postman Always Rings Twice, and Gentleman's Agreement; as Jacob Garfinkle, in New York City, United States (d. 1952)

== March 5, 1913 (Wednesday) ==
- Seventy-one men were drowned when the German destroyer S-178 was rammed by the German cruiser Yorck in the North Sea off of Heligoland.
- Cyril Jackson and the Municipal Reform Party defeated John Benn and the Progressive Party in elections for the London County Council, the last municipal election to be held before the outbreak of World War I suspended all such elections.
- The United States Army established the first American air military unit, then known as 1st Aero Squadron. It is now the 1st Reconnaissance Squadron of the United States Air Force.
- The rail line between Vredenburg and Saldanha, South Africa began operating.
- The daily Sri Lankan newspaper The Ceylonese began publication in Colombo.

== March 6, 1913 (Thursday) ==
- The tercentenary of the reign of the Romanov dynasty was celebrated across the Russian Empire. The date of the celebration was February 21, 1913, according to the Julian calendar. The Russian Empire had not yet adopted the Gregorian calendar, which was 13 days ahead of the Julian calendar. Tsar Nicholas, the last reigning member of the dynasty, would be deposed less than five years later.
- Mexican revolutionary Pancho Villa, who had been living at the Hotel Roma in El Paso, Texas under the alias "Doroteo Arango," crossed the Rio Grande back into Mexico, along with eight companions, to rebuild his army and to overthrow Mexican President Victoriano Huerta. By year's end, Villa would have control of the state of Chihuahua, which served as his base for anti-government raids.
- William Bauchop Wilson, no relation to newly inaugurated U.S. President Woodrow Wilson, took office as the first United States Secretary of Labor. On the same day, William C. Redfield was sworn in as the first United States Secretary of Commerce, moving into the offices of Charles Nagel, the last Secretary of Commerce and Labor.
- As part of the commemoration of the Romanov dynasty, Tsar Nicholas established the Insignia of Saint Olga as a decoration specifically for women who made contributions to the Russian Empire. It was only awarded once before the monarchy was toppled by the Russian Revolution.
- The Sioux City Free Public Library was opened in Sioux City, Iowa thanks to funding from the Carnegie Foundation. It was added to the National Register of Historic Places in 1997.
- The protest song, "The Tramp" by labor activist Joe Hill, was published in the Little Red Songbook of the Industrial Workers of the World, one of the 25 songs Hill had written over his life and career.

== March 7, 1913 (Friday) ==
- More than 40 people were killed in Baltimore when 340 tons of dynamite on the steamship Alum Chine exploded. Most of the dead were on the tugboat Atlantic, which had returned to the ship to rescue two sailors who had not been evacuated.
- The city of Port Coquitlam, British Columbia was established.
- Born: Elmer Lower, American television news executive, president of ABC News from 1963 to 1974; in Kansas City, Missouri, United States (d. 2011)
- Died: E. Pauline Johnson, 51, Canadian poet, known for poetry collections on indigenous culture including The White Wampum and Flint and Feather, died of breast cancer. (b. 1861)

== March 8, 1913 (Saturday) ==
- The second criminal trial of renowned lawyer Clarence Darrow, on charges of attempted bribery, ended in a hung jury, with 8 of the 12 jurors in favor of conviction, less than the unanimous vote necessary. After the first two trials failed to reach a verdict, a third trial was not attempted and Darrow would return to practice.
- The Federal League, intended as a third major baseball league to challenge the existing National and American Leagues, was founded in Indianapolis by John T. Powers. It would last for two seasons, 1914 and 1915.
- The museum and library branch of the opera house La Scala in Milan was established.
- The village of Youngstown, Alberta was established.
- Died: Louis Saint-Gaudens, 57, American sculptor, member of the Beaux-Art movement, brother to Augustus Saint-Gaudens (b. 1854)

== March 9, 1913 (Sunday) ==
- Dr. Friedrich Friedmann of Germany, who had announced that he had developed a cure for tuberculosis that he would sell for one million dollars, gave the first demonstration of his treatment before U.S. government officials. Seven patients were injected with the Friedmann vaccine at the Mount Sinai Hospital in New York City, in the presence of more than 30 physicians and surgeons.

== March 10, 1913 (Monday) ==
- The Quebec Bulldogs, champions of the National Hockey Association, kept the Stanley Cup in a two-game sweep in a challenge by the Sydney Millionaires of the Maritime Professional Hockey League. After winning the first game 14-3, the Bulldogs won the second one, 6-2.
- French sculptor Camille Claudel was committed to a mental hospital at Ville-Evrard near Paris, where she would spend the remaining 30 years of her life.
- Died: Harriet Tubman, 90–91, American abolitionist, social activist, Civil War scout and spy, former slave who rescued enslaved African Americans as a conductor on the Underground Railroad. She was given a burial with full military honors at Auburn, New York. (b. 1822)

== March 11, 1913 (Tuesday) ==
- Edmond Perreyon of France set a new record for highest altitude in an airplane, reaching 19,281 feet.
- The last civil suits arising from the Triangle Shirtwaist Factory fire of March 25, 1911 were settled. Building owners Max Blanck and Isaac Harris paid $75 apiece for each dead woman or girl whose family had brought a wrongful death suit.
- Died:
  - Godfrey Morgan, Viscount Tredegar, 81, Welsh officer in the British Army. Tredegar was a survivor of the Charge of the Light Brigade as captain of a unit in the 17th Lancers that rode "into the Valley of Death" during the Crimean War in 1854. (b. 1831)
  - John Shaw Billings, 74, American librarian, first director of the New York Public Library (b. 1838)

== March 12, 1913 (Wednesday) ==
- The new capital of Australia was christened in a ceremony that saw the unveiling of three pillars of a memorial column by Baron Denman, Governor-General of Australia, Andrew Fisher, Prime Minister of Australia, and Minister for Home Affairs King O'Malley. At noon, Lady Denman opened a gold cigarette case, withdrew the paper inside, and announced "I name the Capital of Australia 'Canberra.'" Canberra, which was among almost 1,000 suggestions submitted to the federal government, had first been used in 1826 by J. J. Moore in an application to purchase land in what would become the Australian Capital Territory. Other suggestions had been Kangaremu, Blueducks, Eucalypta, Myola, Gonebroke, Swindleville and Cooeeoomoo, and the second most popular proposal had been Shakespeare.
- Plans were announced by the British Prime Minister's Office to reform the House of Lords, taking away its veto power and abolishing the hereditary succession.
- The football club Dornbirn was established in Dornbirn, Austria.

== March 13, 1913 (Thursday) ==
- Husband and wife archaeologists Katherine and William Scoresby Routledge began the Mana Expedition to Easter Island, leaving Falmouth, Cornwall, England on the ship Mana and arriving to the island just over a year later.
- Film stuntman and daredevil Rodman Law, who billed himself as "The Human Bullet," attempted to become the first passenger in a manned rocket flight. Law constructed a 44 foot long steel missile, set it up on a vacant lot in Jersey City, set the angle at 45 degrees and aimed the craft at Elizabeth, New Jersey, twelve miles away. Wearing a parachute, he then climbed into a seat on the rocket and told his assistant, fireworks factory manager Samuel Serpico, to light the fuse to ignite of 900 pounds of gunpowder. Law told the crowd that his plan was to bail out when he reached an altitude of 3,500 feet, but the rocket exploded on the launchpad. Law was only slightly injured in the blast, and no spectators were hurt, and he "continued to perform stunts, though never again in a rocket."
- Dr. Simon Flexner announced to an audience of physicians at Johns Hopkins University that he had discovered the germ that caused polio. The germ proved to be a virus, although Flexner's discovery that antibodies, yet to be discovered, could successfully attack the disease would send research in the direction of finding a means of developing the immunization against the poliomyelitis virus.
- The Edmonton Public Library opened the Strathcona Library, the first major library building in Edmonton.
- Born:
  - William J. Casey, U.S. government official, Director of Central Intelligence from 1981 to 1987; in New York City, United States (d. 1987)
  - Paul Grice, British-American philosopher, promoter of implicature in semantics; as Herbert Paul Grice, in Birmingham, England (d. 1988)
  - Sergey Mikhalkov, Russian writer and lyricist, author of the State Anthem of the Soviet Union, recipient of the Order of St. Andrew; in Moscow, Russian Empire (now Russia) (d. 2009)
- Died:
  - Thomas Krag, 44, Norwegian writer, known for works including Ada Wilde and Mindeudgave (b. 1868)
  - Félix Resurrección Hidalgo, 58, Filipino artist, member of the Ilustrado movement, known for works including Las Virgenes Cristianas Expuestas al Populacho and La barca de Aqueronte (b. 1855)

== March 14, 1913 (Friday) ==
- The first esophagectomy and resection was performed by Dr. Franz Torek at the Lenox Hill Hospital in New York, as Dr. Torek operated upon a patient with esophageal cancer and performed a bypass. The unidentified patient survived for 13 more years after the operation.
- In South Africa, Justice Malcolm Searle ruled that only Christian marriages were legal under the nation's laws, effectively invalidating the marital status of most of the British Indian residents.
- The Heryford Brothers Building was dedicated in Lakeview, Oregon, as the town's main flagship commercial building. It was added to the National Register of Historic Places in 1980.
- Died: Hale White, 81, British novelist who wrote under the pen name Mark Rutherford (b. 1831)

== March 15, 1913 (Saturday) ==
- U.S. President Woodrow Wilson assembled about 100 reporters in his office and began the practice of holding a regular presidential press conference. Wilson's secretary, Joseph Patrick Tumulty, arranged the first and subsequent events and introduced the President on each occasion, becoming, in effect, the first White House Press Secretary.
- The Antarctic ship Aurora arrived in Tasmania, Australia, at Hobart, with the news of the deaths of two of the three members of the Far Eastern Party of the Australasian Antarctic Expedition (Belgrave Ninnis and Xavier Mertz) and the stranding of expedition leader Douglas Mawson.
- The opera Das Spielwerk und die Prinzessin by composer Franz Schreker premiered simultaneously in Frankfurt and Vienna.
- The Phoenix Picturehouse opened in Oxford, England. It remained an independent movie house until 1989 when it came under ownership of Picturehouse Cinemas.
- The sports club, All Boys, was established in Floresta, Buenos Aires, Argentina. The club now hosts association football, basketball, futsal, handball, roller skating, and martial arts.
- Defensor Sporting was established in Montevideo and became known for its programs in association football and basketball.
- Born: Macdonald Carey, American television actor and Emmy Award winner known for 29 seasons as "Dr. Horton" on the daytime soap opera Days of Our Lives; as Edward Macdonald Carey, in Sioux City, Iowa, United States (d. 1994)

== March 16, 1913 (Sunday) ==
- A crowd of 120,000 demonstrators turned out at Le Pré-Saint-Gervais, near Paris, to protest a recent decision by French Army officials to require three years of military service.
- The first animated cartoon series made its debut in movie theaters, as filmmaker Émile Cohl produced 13 episodes adapting The Newlyweds, a comic strip by George McManus. The first installment, featuring the characters of "Maggie and Jiggs" from what would later be called Bringing Up Father, was entitled "When He Wants a Dog, He Wants a Dog."
- Died: Louis-Maurice Boutet de Monvel, 62, French artist, best known for his illustrations for children's literature including Fables de La Fontaine and Jeanne d'Arc (b. 1850)

== March 17, 1913 (Monday) ==
- New York State Senator Franklin D. Roosevelt, 31, was sworn into office as the youngest Assistant Secretary of the Navy in American history, and the first federal government job for the future President of the United States.

== March 18, 1913 (Tuesday) ==
- King George of Greece was assassinated in Salonika while walking the streets of the city recently captured from the Ottoman Empire. The King, who had refused bodyguards and was accompanied only by his equerry, was shot in the back by Aleko Schinas, a Greek citizen. The King had told a lunch guest earlier that day that he intended to abdicate in October, on the jubilee of his coronation; Schinas would die two months later, after plummeting from a balcony while in police custody. Coincidentally, he had been selected as King of Greece by the Greek National Assembly on March 18, 1863, on the calendar that Greece was using at the time; the date was March 30, 1863 on the Gregorian calendar which Greece had adopted by 1913.
- France's Prime Minister Aristide Briand, who had recently taken office after Raymond Poincaré's election as President, resigned along with his entire cabinet after a vote that undid the new electoral reform law.
- Utah became the first U.S. state to have a minimum wage law take effect, with the authorization for a wage, and creation of a commission to regulate it, taking effect upon enactment. Massachusetts and Oregon had enacted laws earlier, which would go into effect during the summer.
- U.S. President Woodrow Wilson announced that the U.S. government was withdrawing approval of American banks in the proposed six-nation loan to China. The bankers withdrew the next day.
- Fred Jackson, owner of a photography store in Chicago, appeared before court on charges of indecency for showing in his display window a reproduction of the painting September Morn by French painter Paul Émile Chabas, which features a nude model wading in a lake. Jackson, acting as his own defense, was able to convince the jury the painting was not indecent and he should be able to display the reproduction. A few days later, Carter Harrison IV (the mayor of Chicago) went to city council and asked for stricter obscenity laws, resulting again in a public display of the reproduction being outlawed and Jackson and other gallery owners where again charged for violating obscenity laws.
- Born:
  - René Clément, French film director, recipient of the Cannes Film Festival Award for Best Director for The Battle of the Rails and The Walls of Malapaga, and the Golden Lion for Forbidden Games; in Bordeaux, France (d. 1996)
  - Werner Mölders, German air force officer, commander of the Jagdgeschwader 53 and 51 for the Luftwaffe during World War II, recipient of the Knight's Cross of the Iron Cross and Spanish Cross; in Gelsenkirchen, German Empire (now Germany) (killed in plane crash, 1941)
  - Reinhard Hardegen, German naval officer, commander of German U-boats U-147 and U-123 during World War II, recipient of the Knight's Cross of the Iron Cross; in Bremen, German Empire (now Germany) (d. 2018)
- Died: Louis André, 74, French Minister of War for France during the Affair of the Cards (b. 1838)

== March 19, 1913 (Wednesday) ==
- The opera Boris Godunov was performed for the first time in the United States, at the Metropolitan Opera in New York City.
- Born: Smoky Dawson, Australian country music singer and pioneer in introducing the genre Down Under; as Herbert Henry Brown, in Collingwood, Victoria, Australia (d. 2008)

== March 20, 1913 (Thursday) ==
- Song Jiaoren (Sung Chiao-jen), the President of the Kuomintang Party in the Republic of China, was shot and fatally wounded while waiting for a train in Shanghai; Song would die two days later. Song's killer, Wu Shiying, had been assisted by Ying Guixing, and a search of their apartments found documents linking the murder to cabinet Minister Hong Shuzu, Interior Minister Zhao Bingjun, and even President Yuan Shikai. Ying would be murdered in January after escaping from prison, and Wu would be found dead in his cell shortly afterward.
- Kansas became the first in the United States to legalize the practice of chiropractors. Massachusetts would become the last, legalizing chiropractic treatment in 1966.
- The Dhaka Museum was established in Shahbag, Bengal, the precursor to the Bangladesh National Museum. It would be inaugurated by Governor of Bengal Thomas Gibson-Carmichael on August 7.

== March 21, 1913 (Friday) ==
- Constantine took the oath of office as the new King of Greece.
- Louis Barthou became the new Prime Minister of France.
- Albert Schweitzer set out from France as a medical missionary to establish a leper hospital at Lambaréné, French Africa.
- Born: George Abecassis, British racing driver, co-founder of the HWM Formula One team; in Oatlands, Surrey, England (d. 1991)
- Died: Manuel Bonilla, 63, President of Honduras since 1912; he had previously served as President from 1903 to 1907 (b. 1849)

== March 22, 1913 (Saturday) ==
- Wireless communication between the United States and France began when the U.S. station at Arlington, Maryland sent a message received at the Eiffel Tower in Paris.
- Vajiravudh, King Rama VI of Siam, decreed two laws governing the surnames and the citizenship of subjects in what is now Thailand. Besides requiring all persons to have the family name of their father or husband, Rama VI also decreed that all persons born to a Siamese father, anywhere in the world, were Siamese citizens, as were all persons born to a Siamese mother when the father was unknown, and any foreign woman with a Siamese husband.
- U.S. Navy destroyer Benham was launched by William Cramp & Sons in Philadelphia. It would serve in World War I before being decommissioned in 1922.
- Phi Kappa Pi was established at McGill University in Toronto to create Canada's first and only national fraternity.
- Phan Xích Long, the self-proclaimed Emperor of Vietnam, was arrested for organising a revolt against the colonial rule of French Indochina. The unsuccessful revolt was carried out by his supporters the following day.
- Born:
  - Lew Wasserman, American music and film studio executive who was president of MCA for over six decades, in Cleveland, Ohio, United States (d. 2002)
  - Tom McCall, American politician, Governor of Oregon 1967 to 1975; as Thomas McCall, in Scituate, Massachusetts, United States (d. 1983)
  - Chuck Dederich, American cultist and founder of the religious movement Church of Synanon; as Charles E. Dederich, in Toledo, Ohio, United States (d. 1997)

== March 23, 1913 (Sunday) ==
- On Easter Sunday, tornadoes swept through Omaha, Nebraska and killed 150 people. The storm activity was followed by heavy rainfall as it moved eastward over the next four days, killing more than 1,000 people in "the most widespread natural disaster the United States had ever endured."
- The March 23 date was the earliest Easter Sunday during the 20th century. March 23 was also the earliest date for Easter in the 21st century (March 23, 2008) and will be the earliest in the 22nd century (March 23, 2160). March 22 is the very earliest possible date for Easter (as the first Sunday after the first full moon after the spring equinox), with the last occurrence on March 22, 1818, and the next one not to happen until March 22, 2285.

== March 24, 1913 (Monday) ==
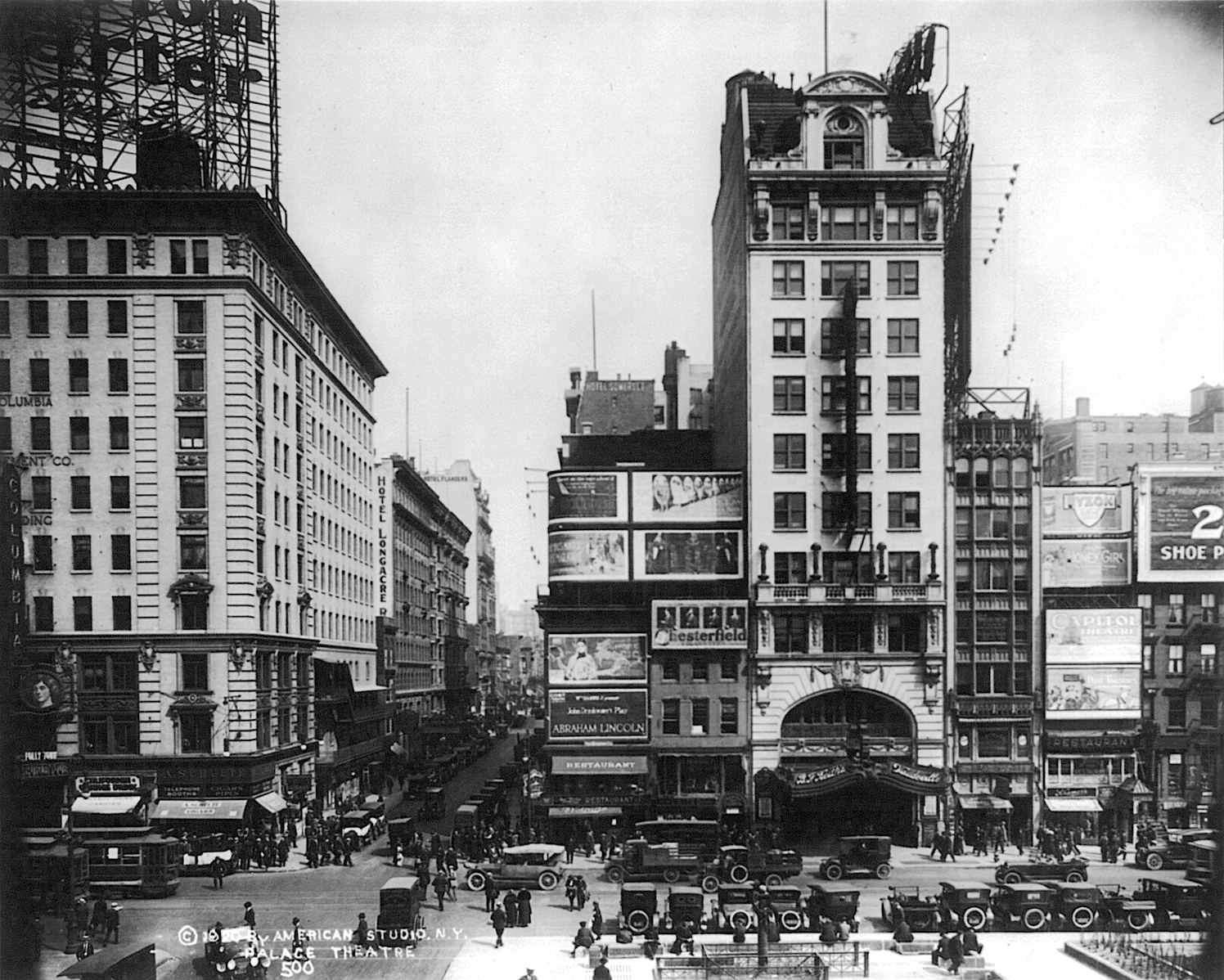
The Palace

- The 1,740-seat Palace Theatre opened at Broadway and West 47th in New York City. Stars for the first night were comedian Cyril Chadwick and comic singer Mabel Berra, who performed in Leo Fall's humorous operetta The Eternal Waltz, dancer Stacia Napierkowska in the final act, "The Captive", and future television, radio and film star Ed Wynn in "The King's Jester". Now a Broadway theatre, it has hosted musicals based on La Cage aux Folles and Beauty and the Beast, the Palace Theatre originally billed itself as "The Valhalla of Vaudeville."
- A new power plant began operating in Tallinn, Estonia. It initially used coal to generate electricity but by 1924 was modified as the first power plant in the world to use oil shale for generating power.
- Born: Ralph Fox, American mathematician, known for his work in differential topology and knot theory; in Morrisville, Pennsylvania, United States (d. 1973)

== March 25, 1913 (Tuesday) ==
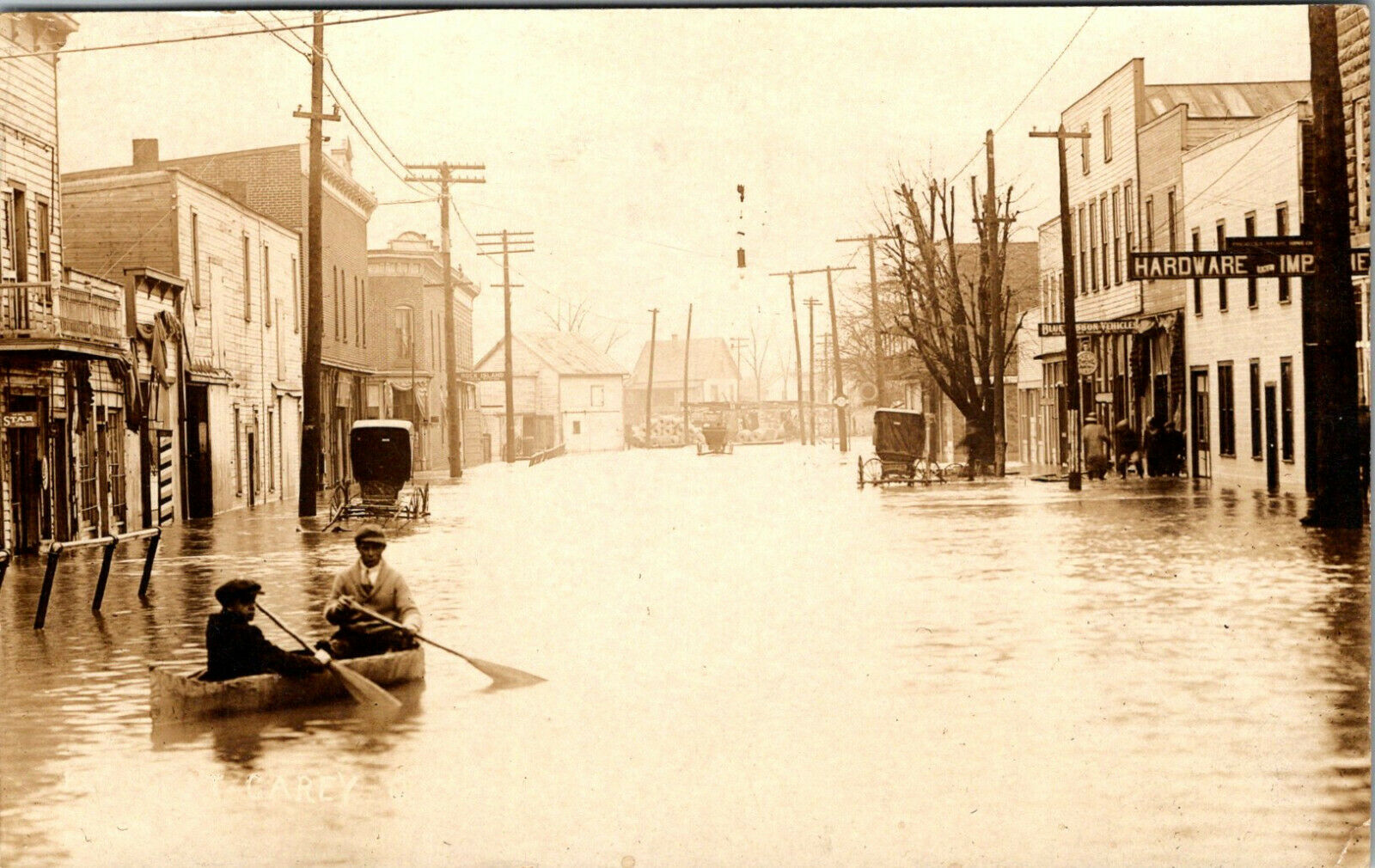
The scene on Main Street in Carey, Ohio

- Dayton, Ohio, was devastated and 400 of its people were killed as the Great Miami River and the Mad River overflowed their banks in heavy rains. Another 100 people died elsewhere in the Ohio River Valley, as the flash flooding happened before many could find higher ground. There was heavy damage to other cities in Ohio, Indiana and Illinois in what would prove to be "the second-worst flood of the 20th century in America", exceeded only by the Great Mississippi Flood of 1927.
- The Alberta Farmers' Co-operative Elevator Company was established to provide grain storage and handling service for farmers in Alberta.
- Born: William G. Gray, English occultist, founder of the Sangreal Sodality Great Britain; in Harrow, London, England (d. 1992)
- Died: Field Marshal Garnet Wolseley, 79, British Army career officer, Commander-in-Chief of the Forces from 1895 to 1900, known for his modernization of the service (b. 1833)

== March 26, 1913 (Wednesday) ==
- The Battle of Adrianople was won when Bulgarian troops captured the historic city (called Edirne by the Turks, Odrin by the Bulgarians) that had once served as the capital of the Ottoman Empire. Four months later, after the Second Balkan War broke out between Greece, Serbia and Bulgaria, the Turkish Ottoman troops would recapture the city on July 23, 1913.
- The Mexican Revolution began as Venustiano Carranza announced his Plan of Guadalupe, and started a rebellion against Victoriano Huerta's government as head of the Constitutionalists.
- The Illinois General Assembly filled the vacancies in both of its United States Senate seats by electing Republican Lawrence Yates Sherman and Democrat J. Hamilton Lewis.
- Born:
  - Paul Erdős, Hungarian mathematician, known for his prolific output in the field including over 1,500 articles and co-author of 500 more; in Budapest, Austria-Hungary (now Hungary) (d. 1996)
  - Jacqueline de Romilly, French-Greek linguist, known for her work in Greek language and the second woman to be admitted to the Académie Française; as Jacqueline David, in Chartres, France (d. 2010)

== March 27, 1913 (Thursday) ==
- The Arkansas Supreme Court ruled unanimously in Futrell v. Oldham that State Senate President pro tempore Junius Marion Futrell was the Governor of Arkansas, after Futrell and former President pro tempore William Kavanaugh Oldham had both claimed the office. Joseph Taylor Robinson had resigned on March 8, and Oldham had acted as Governor. When Futrell was selected as President pro tempore five days later, on March 13, Oldham claimed that he was still the Acting Governor, while Futrell sued on grounds that only the President pro tem could serve in the Governor's duties. For the next two weeks, Governor Futrell kept his offices in the south wing of the State Capitol at Little Rock, Arkansas, while Governor Oldham served in the north wing.
- The daily newspaper, Le Droit, began publication in Ottawa, primarily to provide an editorial response to Regulation 17, a piece of legislation by the Government of Ontario that was criticized for shutting French-language schools in eastern Ontario. It continues to be Ontario's top selling francophone newspaper.
- Finnish composer Jean Sibelius first conducted his orchestral composition, The Bard, with the Philharmonic Society Orchestra in Helsinki, but revised it 1914 and conducted it again in 1916.

== March 28, 1913 (Friday) ==
- The car factory at Cowley, Oxfordshire, where the BMW MINI Cooper automobile is now manufactured, turned out its very first car, as Morris Motors opened Britain's first motor vehicle assembly line to produce the Morris Oxford, nicknamed the "bullnose." Celebrating 100 years of continuous operation in 2013, Plant Oxford is the oldest assembly plant in the world.
- Floyd Allen and his son, Claud Allen, were executed by electric chair for the murder the judge, sheriff, county prosecutor and three other people in Carroll County, Virginia on March 14, 1912, after Floyd had been convicted of obstruction of justice.
- The country love ballad, "The Trail of the Lonesome Pine", by Ballard MacDonald and Harry Carroll, was the first record by opera singer Manuel Romain and released in album form in June by Blue Amberol Records.
- Born: Kazuo Taoka, Japanese gangster, one of three leaders of the Yamaguchi-gumi, the largest yakuza organization in Japan; in Higashimiyoshi, Tokushima Prefecture, Japanese Empire (now Japan) (d. 1981)

== March 29, 1913 (Saturday) ==
- The Amalgamated Society of Railway Servants, General Railway Workers' Union, and the United Pointsmen and Signalmen's Society merged to form the National Union of Railwaymen in the United Kingdom.
- Nearing the end of his life, American novelist Henry James published the first installment of his autobiographical series, with the release of A Small Boy and Others by Charles Scribner's Sons to booksellers in the United States. The sequel, Notes of a Son and Brother would come out a year later; James would pass away at the age of 72 on February 28, 1916, before he could complete The Middle Years.
- The sports club Aldosivi was established in Mar del Plata, Argentina. Initially, it specialized in association football but expanded to include martial arts and roller skating.
- Born:
  - R. S. Thomas, Welsh clergy and poet, known for his poetry collections including Song at the Year's Turning and Blwyddyn yn Llŷn (A Year in Llŷn); as Ronald Stuart Thomas, in Cardiff, Wales (d. 2000)
  - Hyman Bloom, Latvian-American artist, known for work including his Séance and Seascape series; as Hyman Melamed, in Brunavišķi, Latvia, Russian Empire (now Latvia) (d. 2009)

== March 30, 1913 (Sunday) ==
- Italian battleship Andrea Doria was launched by La Spezia shipyard in Naples, to serve as one of two in her class for defense against the Austro-Hungarian Navy.
- Burgers' Dierenpark, at the time the largest zoo in the Netherlands, was opened by Dutch businessman Johan Burgers at Arnhem.
- Born:
  - Ċensu Tabone, Maltese state leader, 4th President of Malta (1989-1994); as Vincent Tabone, in Città Victoria, British Malta (now Malta) (d. 2012)
  - Richard Helms, American intelligence officer, U.S. Director of Central Intelligence from 1966 to 1973; in St. Davids, Pennsylvania, United States (d. 2002)
  - Frankie Laine, American singer, as known for hit songs including "That's My Desire"; as Francesco LoVechhio, in Chicago, United States (d. 2007)
  - Marc Davis, American animator, member of the Disney's Nine Old Men animated team, animated the lead characters from Snow White and the Seven Dwarfs to One Hundred and One Dalmatians; in Bakersfield, California, United States (d. 2000)

== March 31, 1913 (Monday) ==
- The Ibadan Grammar School was established in Ibadan in the British Lagos Colony (now Nigeria), and remains the oldest operating grammar school in the city.
- The Skandalkonzert took place in Vienna when the first concert performance of a song cycle by Alban Berg, Altenberg Lieder, ended prematurely as a result of fights breaking out between audience members and the Vienna Orchestra, conducted by Arnold Schoenberg.
- The musical play The Tik-Tok Man of Oz by L. Frank Baum with music composed by Louis F. Gottschalk premiered at the Majestic Theatre in Los Angeles.
- The comic strip Keeping Up with the Joneses by Pop Momand began its run in The New York Globe. Its focus on a family of social climbers eventually led the comic's title to become the popular idiom "keeping up with the Joneses," which refers to maintaining a social and economic status that is comparable to one's peers. The strip ran until 1938.
- The first performance in the Metropolitan Theatre in Cleveland (now the Agora Theatre and Ballroom) was an English-language production of the opera Aida.
- Jim Hogg County, Texas was established from portions of Brooks County and Duval County, with Hebbronville as its seat.
- Born: Etta Baker, American blues musician, renowned guitarist and singer of the Piedmont blues genre; as Etta Reid, in Caldwell County, North Carolina, United States (d. 2006)
- Died: J. P. Morgan, 75, the architect of the modern American financial industry, died in his sleep while staying at the Grand Hotel Plaza in Rome. In New York City, flags were flown at half-staff on Wall Street and the New York Stock Exchange closed for two hours in honor of his passing. (b. 1837)
