= Charlotte Lewis (artist) =

American artist (1930–2024)

- Charlotte Lewis, Sister Artist Friend by Jenny Joyce (1999)
- Born: May 1, 1934; Prescott, Arizona, U.S.
- Died: August 17, 1999; Portland, Oregon, U.S.
- Education: Portland Art Museum School
- Known for: Painting; Textile arts; Graphic design
- Movement: Civil rights, Feminist art movement, Black Arts Movement

Charlotte Lewis (born Charlotte LaVerne Graves; May 1, 1934 – August 17, 1999) was an American multimedia painter, muralist, textile artist, commercial artist, and community activist. Her work is recognized for its beauty and vitality, as well as for the historically significant themes of Black art and feminism. Her pieces are infused with bright colors, whimsical figures, intricate symbols, and African themes.

Beyond her artistry, Lewis was known for her community activism. "Charlotte devoted herself to making art flourish in the community," according to Richard Brown, a friend, photographer, and community activist. She created outdoor murals highlighting racism and injustice, using her art to educate and inspire her Black community by illustrating its values, principles, and history.

During her lifetime, Lewis received little recognition beyond her predominantly Black Northeast Portland community. However, her work was included in the 2024 Black Artists of Oregon exhibition at the Portland Art Museum, where she received prominent recognition. Today, her work is displayed in public and private spaces. Although she sold her own artwork, she rarely exhibited.

Lewis died of breast cancer at the age of sixty-five.

== Early life ==
Lewis was born in Prescott, Arizona, to Lillian and Charles Graves. In 1937, the family moved to Portland. She had four sisters—Bernice, Jacqueline, Lucille, and Marian—all of whom lived in Portland, and three brothers who later lived outside of Portland: Joseph and Charles in Kansas and Jerry in Texas.

Lewis attended school in Portland, graduating from Boise-Eliot/Humboldt Elementary School and Girls Polytechnic High School, where she majored in art. She completed her education in 1955 at the Portland Art Museum school. She began her career as a graphic designer at the Meier & Frank department store in Portland. According to a funeral flyer archived at the Oregon Historical Society, she later worked as a window decorator at Lipman & Wolfe department store and as a cake designer at Helen Bernhard Bakery. According to her funeral flyer, by the mid-1960s she felt "unhappy and unfulfilled." She wanted to express herself through her art and moved to San Francisco in search of opportunities. There, she changed her last name to Lewis, though no reason for the name change is currently known. Lewis returned briefly to Portland seven years later before moving to New York, then Pennsylvania. She ultimately returned to Portland in the late 1970s, "and decided to dedicate her life to enhancing the contributions of African Americans through her art and by supporting other Black artists."

== Artwork ==
Lewis's work includes paintings of various sizes, public murals, posters, textile art, multimedia sculptures, decorated gourds, and personal cards. She worked in multiple mediums, including oil, acrylic, watercolor, and textiles, and regularly produced multimedia pieces. Throughout her career, she also produced commercial illustrations for posters, brochures, children's books, and paintings that adorn McMenamins brewpubs and hotels.

Social activism was central to Lewis's work. She incorporated principles from two significant 20th-century Black art movements: the Harlem Renaissance of the 1920s and 1930s and the Black Arts Movement of the 1960s and 1970s. Her artwork includes Egyptian images to assert ancient Egyptian ancestry as belonging to the people of Africa and its diaspora, rather than those of the Western European culture, a key principle of the Harlem Renaissance movement. She also used African symbolism to emphasize a Black American identity before slavery, a core tenet of the Black Arts Movement. Her art pays tribute to Black heroes such as John Coltrane and Sojourner Truth and tells the story of Portland's racist history and illuminates efforts to rise above racism at John D. Kennedy Elementary School, now operated by McMenamins as a brewpub and hotel known as Kennedy School.

Additionally, Lewis employed textiles as an artistic medium, aligning with the feminist art traditions of the 20th century.

=== Outdoor murals ===
Lewis collaborated on two outdoor murals in Portland and was the lead artist of another mural. She was a "vital team member" on Struggle and Hope (1988), a mural depicting the United States’ role in Central America during the 1970s and 1980s. Originally located at SW 14th and Yamhill in Portland, the mural was later stored and eventually donated to Portland Community College in 2015, where it is displayed on the Rock Creek Campus. Longtime friend, Susan Bloom, tells the story of how Lewis gracefully took questions from passers-by as she worked on the mural. "For Charlotte, the biggest part of the art was response."

Lewis was the lead artist on Scenes of Learning (1989), a 19-by-69-foot mural celebrating Black education. Located on the south wall of the Irvington Covenant Church at NE Martin Luther King Boulevard and Shaver Street in Portland, the mural illustrated the historical progression of Black education. With this outdoor mural, Lewis carried on the tradition of Black artists who have a long history of using outdoor spaces to showcase their art and convey messages of Black history and pride.

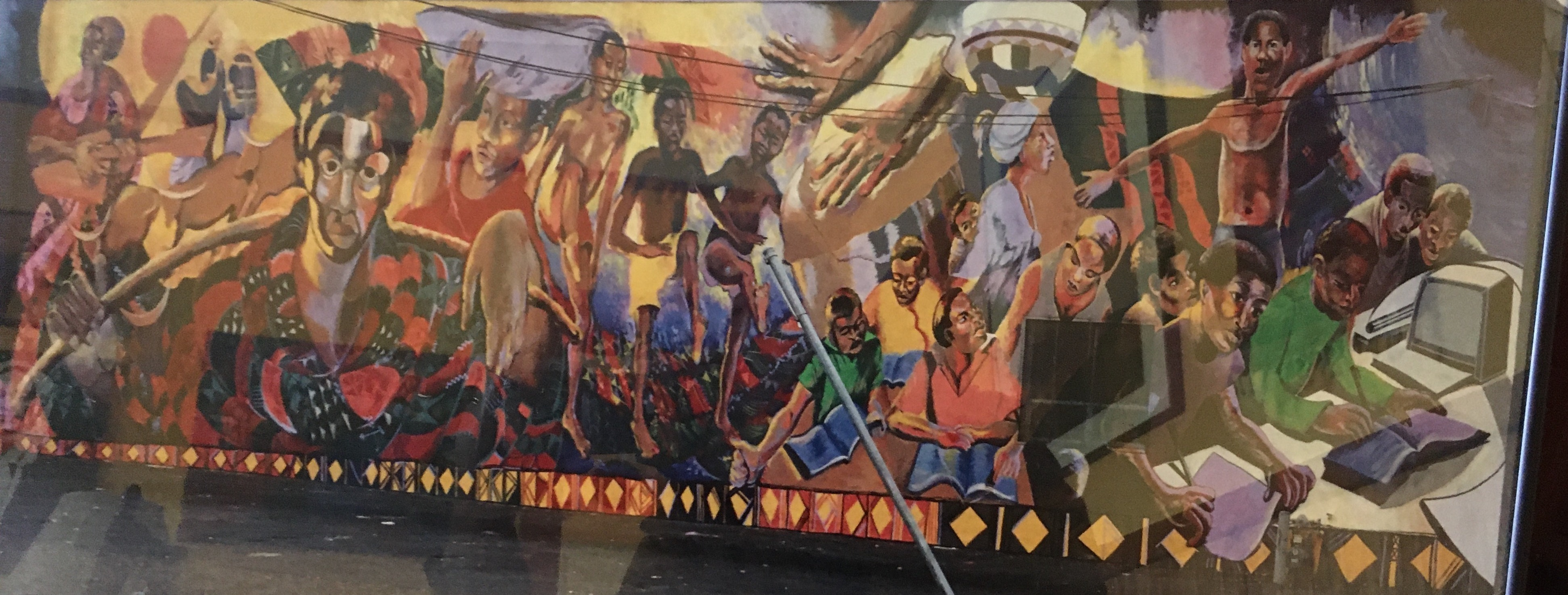

As the painting progresses from left to right, the scenes also move forward in time from ancient to contemporary. The images depict different educational settings, including a scene with two ancient Egyptian figures. The most prominent figure in the Scenes of Learning mural is a Black person who holds a long, thin pole that rests on the figure's shoulders. A related detail is three long-horned cattle. These elements hint at indigenous African animal herding and show pride in African heritage. On the right side, the mural has contemporary classroom scenes featuring Black children learning on computers. Lewis is remembered for her work with children. She taught art at the Black Educational Center in Portland and in Portland Public Schools. The mural was a testament to Lewis's belief in education as a tool for empowerment. Due to the wall's deterioration, the mural was torn down.

In 1990, Lewis contributed to another mural called For the People. The painting covered two walls of Portland's Outside In clinic at SW 13th and Salmon in Portland. Mark Meltzer, a fellow contributor, described Lewis as "a true community muralist whose inclusivity was astonishing." According to Meltzer, Lewis painted the north wall of the mural. The painting was demolished in 2001 when the Outside In building was torn down and replaced with a larger facility.

=== Large-scale indoor murals ===
Lewis created the African American panel for the "We Speak" traveling mural project, which was an artistic response to the five-hundredth anniversary of Columbus's arrival in the Western hemisphere. The project used fourteen portable panels to illustrate "that deep historical cultural traditions can flourish despite repression." Lewis painted one of the fourteen panels and named it Mama Africa (1992).

In another large-scale indoor wall painting, Lewis again made a statement about her Black community and African heritage. The large and vibrant yellow, blue, green, and red painting, Children of Humanity (1995), was created to inspire a strong relationship between the community's youth, elders, and authority figures. It was produced with the assistance of elders from the Northeast Multicultural Senior Center who helped paint the frame. The work is designed to give the community's youth a sense of ancestral pride. In the painting, Black children jump rope and play clapping and string games. Other Black figures dance, repair a bicycle, and play a drum. In keeping with the theme of promoting racial pride by referring to African heritage, Lewis depicts the figures surrounded by small Ghanaian adinkra symbols. In Ghana, adinkra are symbols that represent life principles and truths.

=== Textiles ===
Lewis invited fellow artist Adriene Cruz to exhibit with her at a future Graystone Gallery show scheduled for May 1992. In preparation, the two artists made several retreats to the home and arts center of a friend, Roho Shinda, in Yakima, Washington. Cruz recalls the time as magical: “We worked outside until the sun went down and continued inside until the sun came up again. We were children discovering something new every day and our work was forever changed from that experience.” During this time Lewis created her first “fabric painting,” the vibrantly colored triptych Isis, (1992), permanently on display at the North Portland branch of Multnomah County Library. Lewis denotes the lone figure with the title of the piece, the Egyptian goddess Isis. She depicts the goddess as a Black woman and gives her wings, as she surfs on the back of a crocodile. Again, Lewis uses her art to claim African ancestry that long precedes slavery as a way to build Black pride. And by using strips of cloth rather than paint, Lewis made the feminist statement that materials historically associated with women can be made into fine art.

Lewis's work is decorated with other symbols of ancient Egypt, including the scarab beetle and the ankh. According to Cruz, Lewis had a strong interest in “ancient civilizations and Egypt in particular.”

Other quilts that Lewis completed pay tribute to Harriet Tubman and Marcus Garvey. Lewis credited her grandmother's quilt work as the foundation for her textile work. Although Lewis made quilts for family and friends, she said she did not recognize the importance of her quilt work until later in her own life.

=== Graphic design ===
In addition to creating fine art, Lewis produced graphic design illustrations, brochures, and posters, often incorporating African symbols, values, and figures from the Black community. "Everything in Charlotte's art had meaning," according to Amina Anderson, director of the Black United Fund. Lewis designed posters for the American Cancer Society, the Red Cross, and the Black United Fund, as well as other organizations. She also made commercial art for community organizations such as the Urban League, the American Friends Service Committee, and the Rainbow Coalition.

In addition, Lewis illustrated a series of children's books for the author Ardys Reverman. For a 1998 book, Lewis created twenty vibrant 7-by-5-inch watercolor paintings. In one of the paintings, Lewis makes her point using a real-life Black heroine, Sojourner Truth, the African American abolitionist and feminist who escaped slavery. In the illustration, Truth advises one of the book's characters to “Follow your own North Star.” The watercolor shows a boy as he asks for water and Truth points to the Big Dipper constellation, which includes the North Star. The painting features a border with African adinkra symbols.

== McMenamins brewpubs and hotels ==
In 1997, Lewis began producing paintings for the Kennedy School, a closed elementary school under conversion to a hotel, theater, and brewpub by the McMenamins family. Like many of the properties owned by McMenamins, Kennedy School is in an historic building that is no longer used for its original purpose. When the company acquires a property, its historians conduct research and then hire artists to tell the property's story through art. The school is located north of the historically Black section of Portland. Among the pieces that Lewis worked on are a whimsical painting of a woman sitting at a piano, a group of schoolboys holding model sailboats, and a triptych in honor of the jazz artist, John Coltrane.

The painting of the Black woman at the piano tells the story of Mrs. Jordan, who was a teacher in Portland's Vanport district. When the Vanport area and school were destroyed in 1948 by a flood, Jordan was left without a job. She applied for a teaching job at the Portland Public School District but was rejected because of her race. In a bold move, the Kennedy School principal, who knew of Jordan, hired her to teach kindergarten. Jordan had a reputation for always being close to her piano and often teaching through songs. Lewis illustrates this story in a fanciful painting featuring Jordan in the center at her piano surrounded by children who are unencumbered by the force of gravity. The painting incorporates an element of the maypole dance held at Kennedy School at one time. But in Lewis's artistry, the maypole tethers morph into vines, allowing her to add flowers to the whimsical painting. Mike McMenamin explained in a 2023 interview that artists frequently combined unrelated elements of the property's history into one work. In this case, Lewis integrated the school's history of the maypole dance into a classroom setting with a teacher at the piano.

But not all the works at Kennedy School by Lewis refer directly to Black history. One such piece shows two orderly rows of white boys holding small boats. The themes of children and boats are obvious, and an open book in the background indicates a relationship with the school. A framed newspaper article that hangs today on a wall at Kennedy School reveals the basis for the artwork and explains why only boys are pictured. Going back to 1936, only boys took the manual arts classes where the boats were built and, like all Portland schools, Kennedy School had few Black students due to Oregon's early aggressive laws making it illegal for Black people to live in Oregon and later to real estate practices known as redlining that restricted Black residents from living in the Kennedy School district. When creating this painting, the artist chose to produce an accurate depiction of a difficult element of Portland's history. Lewis created the painting with vibrant shades of blue and yellow and decorated the background spaces with zig-zagging waves and swimming fish.

Lewis honored Black history in a different way in an acrylic-on-board triptych that also hangs at Kennedy School. The work features the noted jazz musician John Coltrane on two of the three panels. Coltrane is considered a key figure of the Black Arts Movement because he created improvisational jazz, a style that was unique to Black artists. According to Mike McMenamin, Lewis was a “huge fan” of Coltrane and proposed the idea of a work featuring the musician. The triptych that Lewis produced shows Coltrane in profile, playing his saxophone on one panel and without the saxophone on a second panel. The second image and three other symbols make a connection to a possible element of Lewis's history from her time in San Francisco. The Coltrane triptych not only honors Lewis's love for the musician but also makes a nod to the St. John Coltrane African Orthodox Church in San Francisco. The side view of Coltrane taken from his A Love Supreme album cover, the crescent moon, the ankh, and the om symbol, all part of the iconography of the church, are included in the panels.

As she did in the Mrs. Jordan painting at Kennedy School, Lewis freely incorporated elements from various aspects of her life. Seemingly mysterious symbols on all three panels connect Black Americans to Africa. Lewis incorporated Egyptian imagery and West African Adinkra symbols to visually articulate her connection to her African ancestry. The Egyptian symbols are the ankh, lotus blossoms, wheat sheaves, and scarab beetles. Lewis honors Black Americans’ connection to Western Africa with prayers to the Yoruba deities that are enclosed in colorful triangle shapes along the bottom of the artwork and spread across all three of the panels. On the middle panel, Lewis especially refers to Ogun, who is the god of iron, by including a tin spoon and small, decorative triangles of tin from a food can. Another element of the mixed-media painting is cowrie shells. Lewis was not alone in infusing her art with African symbols. The practice of incorporating “elements, ideas, and ornamentation from our ancestral homeland characterizes the vision of the Diaspora of many artists,” according to historian Carolyn Mazloomi.

== Kwanzaa celebration ==
"Lewis especially loved the North Portland Library and started the annual Kwanzaa celebration there in 1993." Along with others, including Cruz, Lewis organized a Kwanzaa celebration at either the Interstate Firehouse Cultural Center or the library from 1993 to 1998.

== Personal life ==
Lewis never married and had no children.

== Legacy ==
Within the Portland Black community, Lewis was known for her dedication to art, education, and community. "Everything in Charlotte's life happened for art," according to Brown, the photographer and activist. Lewis was also committed to education. "First and foremost, Charlotte used art as a teaching tool," Cruz said, and added, "For her, it was about communication of community awareness." Anderson of the Black United Fund, noted "We're going to miss her making art so visible and accessible."

== Works in public locations ==
- Isis (1992), Multnomah County Library, North Portland Library, Portland, Oregon
- Children of Humanity (1995), Portland Police Bureau, North Precinct, Community Room, Portland, Oregon
- Basket Weavers (1997) - Kennedy School front hallway, Portland, Oregon
- Shop Class Sailboats (1997) - Kennedy School front hallway, Portland, Oregon
- Martha Jordan (1997) - Kennedy School back hallway, Portland, Oregon
- Birdhouses (1997) - Kennedy School back hallway, Portland, Oregon
- Tea Party - Setting the Table (1997) - Kennedy School north hallway, Portland, Oregon
- Birdhouses (1997) - Kennedy School north hallway, Portland, Oregon
- Girls Jumproping (1997) - Kennedy School English Wing, Portland, Oregon
- John Coltrane Triptych (1998) - Kennedy School front hallway, Portland, Oregon
- Porter (1999) - Roseburg Station Pub and Brewery, Roseburg, Oregon
- The Walnut City (n.d.) - Hotel Oregon fourth floor hallway, McMinnville, Oregon

== See also ==
- African Americans in Oregon
- Harlem Renaissance Movement
- Black Arts Movement
- Feminist art movement in the United States
