= Hataraliyadda =

Coordinates: 7°20′N 80°28′E

Hataraliyadda හතරලියද්ද
- Village
- Interactive map of Hataraliyadda
- Country: Sri Lanka
- Province: Central Province
- District: Kandy
- Time zone: UTC+5:30 (Sri Lanka Standard Time)

Hataraliyadda is a village in Sri Lanka. It is located within Central Province in Kandy district. Hataraliyadda is a intrechange of roads to Galagedara, Muruthalawa, Rambukkana, and Mawathagama. Hataraliyadda is about 18 km away from Nelligala International Buddhist Temple.

== See also ==
- List of towns in Central Province, Sri Lanka
