= Sabine Sicaud =

French poet

Sabine Sicaud (23 February 1913 – 12 July 1928) was a French poet.

She was born in Villeneuve-sur-Lot, a city in southwestern France. When she was eleven, she won her first poetry prize at the Jasmin d'Argent, an annual literary contest held in Agen. At thirteen, she published her Poèmes d'Enfant (Childhood Poems), prefaced by the poet Anna de Noailles. These poems express a child's awakening to the wonders of nature, and display a fervent compassion for all that is vulnerable.

Stricken with what was then a mysterious disease, Sabine died of osteomyelitis at fifteen. During the last year of her life, she expressed her suffering in poems unforgettable in their poignancy and depth of vision. These poems were published for the first time thirty years after her death, under the title Les Poèmes de Sabine Sicaud.

== Bibliography ==
- Poèmes d'enfant. Preface Anna de Noailles. Poitiers: Cahiers de France, 1926.
- Les Poèmes de Sabine Sicaud. Ed. François Millepierres. Paris: Stock, 1958.
- Sabine Sicaud: Le Rêve inachevé. Ed. Odile Ayral-Clause. Bordeaux: Les Dossiers d'Aquitaine, 1996.
- Que nul ne vienne. Que ninguén venha. Trans. Maria da Luz Miranda. Lisbon: Edições Fluviais, 2002.
- To Speak, to Tell You?. Trans. Norman R. Shapiro. Intro. Odile Ayral-Clause. New York: Black Widow Press, 2009. ISBN 0-9818088-8-3
