= North Portland Library =

Library in Portland, Oregon, U.S.

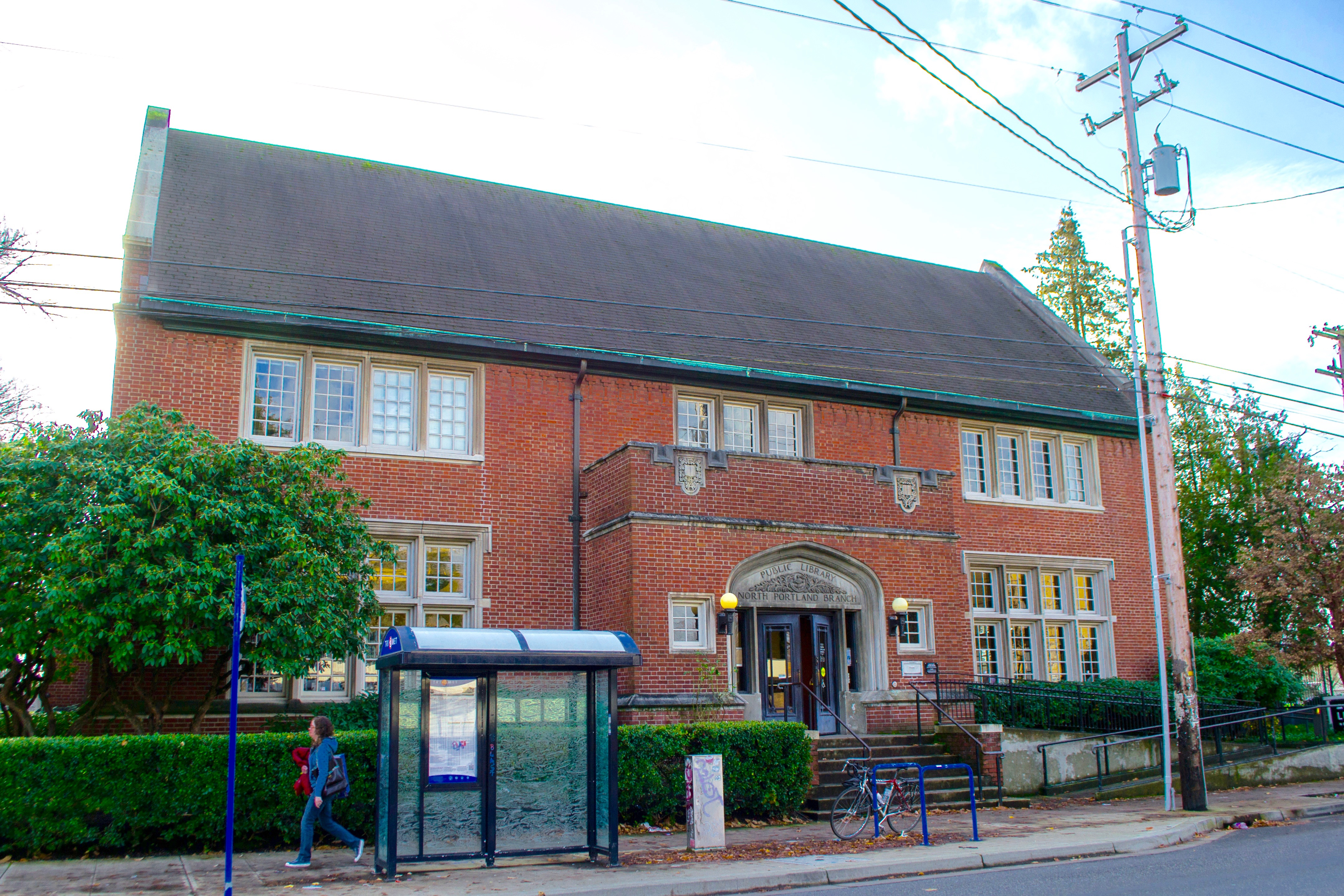
- The front exterior in 2012

- Location within Portland, Oregon

General information
- Architectural style: Jacobean
- Location: 512 N. Killingsworth Street, Portland, Oregon, United States
- Coordinates: 45.562454°N 122.671507°W
- Opened: February 20, 1913
- Renovated: March 21, 2000
- Owner: Multnomah County Library

Technical details
- Floor area: 9,500 square feet (880 m^{2})

Design and construction
- Architecture firm: Jacobberger & Smith

Renovating team
- Renovating firm: Thomas Hacker and Associates
- Structural engineer: Degenkolb Engineers
- Awards: Grand Award (Consulting Engineers Council of Oregon)

The North Portland Library is a branch of the Multnomah County Library, in Portland, Oregon. The branch offers the Multnomah County Library catalog of two million books, periodicals and other materials.

== History ==
Public library service in the neighborhoods of North Portland began with the opening of a reading room on North Albina Street in 1909. Starting with a collection of about 500 books, it became a sub-branch of the Portland library system in 1911 but without all of the services offered by the Central Library in downtown Portland. Later in 1911, the collection was moved to another building and merged with books from another reading room to create the North Albina Library, a branch of the Central Library.

After the Carnegie Corporation of New York donated funds for four new branch libraries in Portland in 1912, the community undertook construction of the North Portland Library to replace the North Albina Library. Built on land donated by neighborhood residents, the Jacobean-style library opened on February 20, 1913, on the corner of North Killingworth Street and North Commercial Avenue. Interior architectural details include an open-beam ceiling and bas-reliefs. Patrons have included students from Jefferson High School, built next door to the library.

In 1955, North Portland Library was among six branches chosen for expanded collections, longer hours, more services, and daily deliveries from the Central Library. In 1987, a wing of the library was devoted to works about African-Americans. In 1996, Multnomah County voters passed a bond measure to renovate and modernize branch libraries in the system. North Portland Library got seismic retrofitting, a new roof, an elevator, new lighting and furniture and telecommunications equipment, more restrooms, and improvements to plumbing and other infrastructure.

The seismic retrofit resulted from changes to Portland's building codes aimed at making structures less likely to collapse during an earthquake. The changes apply to older buildings when they are being altered in other ways such as changing occupancy, building an addition, or repairing the roof. The North Portland Library was particularly vulnerable to strong ground movements because of its unreinforced masonry. Degenkolb Engineers undertook the retrofit. It was the first of its kind in Portland, according to a Degenkolb representative quoted in a news article in the Daily Journal of Commerce. In 2011, Degenkolb won a Grand Award from the Consulting Engineers Council of Oregon for its structural engineering work on the library.

After being closed for about a year for the renovation work, the building reopened on March 21, 2000. Self-checkout stations and security gates were installed in 2011.

== See also ==
- History of libraries
- Library science
- List of Carnegie libraries in Oregon
