= Air-tractor sledge =

First plane taken to Antarctica

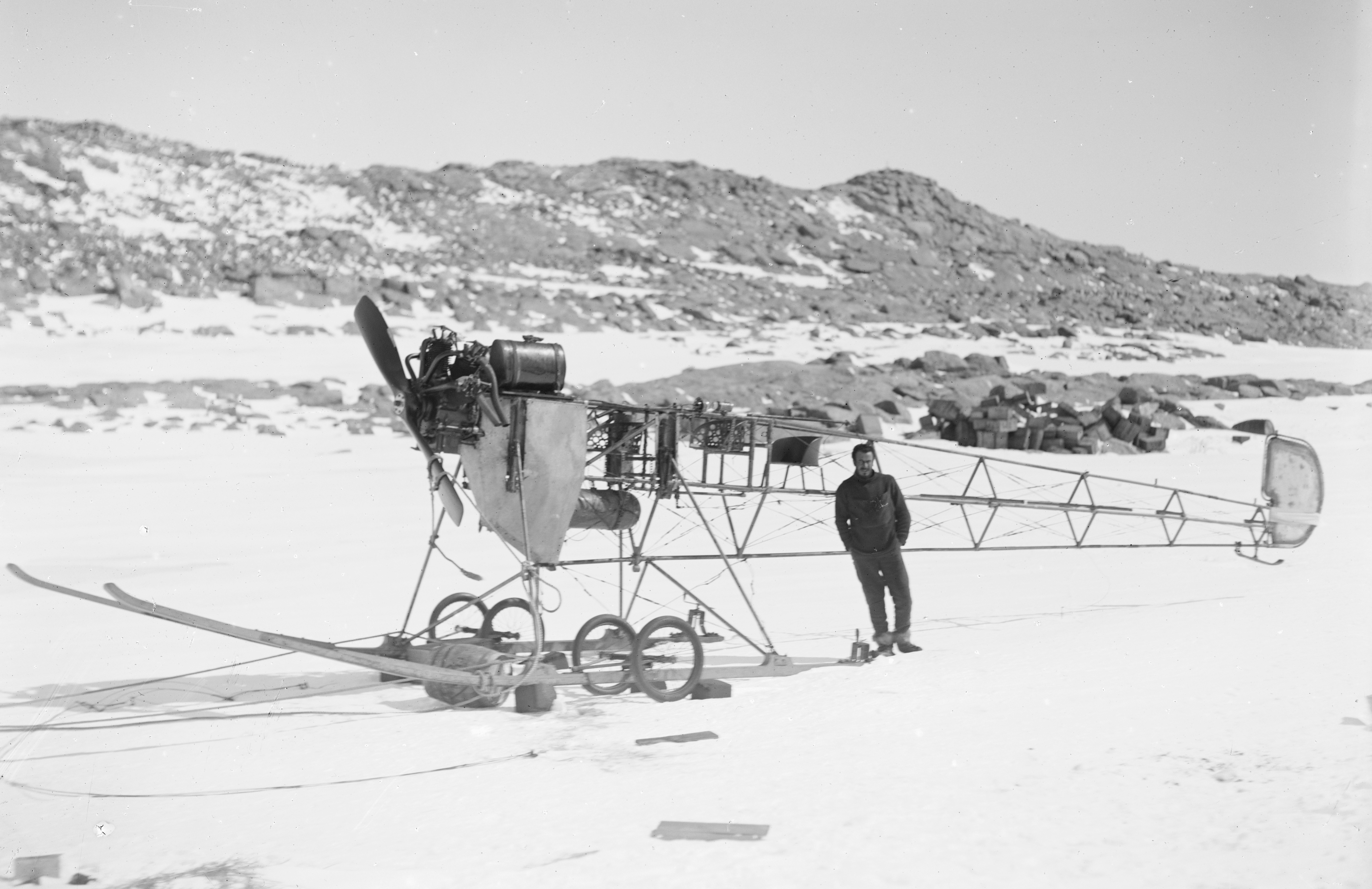
The air-tractor sledge in 1912

The air-tractor sledge was a converted fixed-wing aircraft taken on the 1911–1914 Australasian Antarctic Expedition, the first plane to be taken to the Antarctic.

Expedition leader Douglas Mawson had planned to use the Vickers R.E.P. Type Monoplane as a reconnaissance and search and rescue tool, and to assist in publicity, but the aircraft crashed heavily during a test flight in Adelaide, only two months before Mawson's scheduled departure date. The plane was nevertheless sent south with the expedition, after having been stripped of its wings and metal sheathing from the fuselage.

Engineer Frank Bickerton spent most of the 1912 winter working to convert it to a sledge, fashioning brakes from a pair of geological drills and a steering system from the plane's landing gear. It was first tested on 15 November 1912, and subsequently assisted in laying depots for the summer sledging parties, but its use during the expedition was minimal.

Towing a train of four sledges, the air-tractor accompanied a party led by Bickerton to explore the area to the west of the expedition's base at Cape Denison. The freezing conditions resulted in the jamming of the engine's pistons after just 10 miles (16 km), and the air-tractor was left behind. Some time later it was dragged back to Cape Denison, and its frame was left on the ice when the expedition returned home in 1913.

In 2008, a team from the Mawson's Huts Foundation began searching for the remains of the air-tractor sledge; a seat was found in 2009, and fragments of the tail assembly a year later. The Mawson's Huts Foundation has undertaken extensive investigation using sophisticated equipment in 2009 and 2010. Results indicate that the air tractor, or parts of it, is still buried under three metres (10 ft) of ice where it was abandoned at Cape Denison.

== Background ==
Douglas Mawson had accompanied Ernest Shackleton's 1907–09 British Antarctic Expedition. Along with Edgeworth David and Alistair Mackay, he had been part of a man-hauled sledging expedition, the first to reach the area of the South Magnetic Pole. Upon his return from Antarctica, he recommenced to his post as geology lecturer at the University of Adelaide. Despite an offer from Robert Falcon Scott to join his Terra Nova Expedition to reach the Geographic South Pole, Mawson began planning his own Antarctic expedition. Mawson's plan, which led to the Australasian Antarctic Expedition, envisaged three bases on the Antarctic continent, collectively surveying much of the coast directly south of Australia. He approached Shackleton, who not only approved of his plan but was prepared to lead the expedition himself. Although Shackleton withdrew from the expedition in December 1910, he continued to assist Mawson with publicity and fund-raising.

=== Purchase ===
Mawson travelled to Britain in early 1911 to raise funds, hire crew, and purchase equipment. He considered taking a plane to the Antarctic, which could work as a reconnaissance tool, transport cargo, and assist with search and rescue. Crucially, as no plane had yet been taken to the continent, it could also be used to generate publicity. Unsure of the type of plane he should take, but considering a Blériot, Mawson mentioned his plans to Scott's wife Kathleen Scott, an aircraft enthusiast. She recommended he take a monoplane, and conveyed his interest to Lieutenant Hugh Evelyn Watkins of the Essex Regiment. Watkins had connections with the ship and aircraft manufacturer Vickers Limited, which had recently entered into a licence agreement to build and sell aircraft in Britain designed by the Frenchman Robert Esnault-Pelterie. In a letter to Mawson on 18 May, Kathleen wrote:

The plane in testing, before being shipped to Australia

I believe I can help you about aeroplanes. I think you can do far better than a Bleriot ... There is a machine that the Vickers people have bought which is infinitely more stable, heavier and more solid and will carry more weight. Its cost is £1000, but I think it could be worked to get it for £700 or even less ... A man I know who had only before driven biplanes, drove it and it stayed up half an hour, which speaks very well for its stability ... If you think it's worth considering, I can let you meet the man concerned early next week and he can show you the machine and take you up in it.

On Kathleen Scott's advice, Mawson purchased a Vickers R.E.P. Type Monoplane, one of only eight built. (Note: Bethany Robinson (2004) suggests the British aviator Claude Grahame-White may also have assisted Mawson with the choice of the Vickers. Each of the eight monoplanes was designated a number. As the second monoplane built, Vickers assigned Mawson's plane the designation "No. 2". However, the original "No. 1" monoplane crashed, and Vickers redesignated Mawson's plane "No. 1" before it was shipped to Australia.) It was fitted with a five-cylinder R.E.P. engine developing 60 horsepower (45 kW), and had a maximum range of 300 miles (480 km) at a cruising speed of 48 knots (89 km/h; 55 mph). Its wingspan was 47 feet (14 m), and its length 36 feet (11 m). The pilot used a joystick for pitch and roll, with lateral control by wing warping. Mawson opted for a two-seater version, in a tandem arrangement, with a spare ski undercarriage. The total bill, dated 17 August 1911, came to £955 4s 8d. (Note: Updated value £97,000 using the Retail Price Index.) Mawson hired Watkins to fly the plane, and Frank Bickerton to accompany as engineer. After Vickers tested the aircraft at Dartford and Brooklands, P&O shipped the plane to Adelaide aboard the steamship Macedonia, at half the usual rate of freight. (Note: There was misunderstanding in the press about the expedition objectives Mawson had established, which included no attempt to reach the South Pole; the magazine Flight, for example, reported the plane was "destined for the South Pole Expedition, in which it is proposed Lieut. Watkins shall pilot the machine in the final dash for the Pole." Mawson biographer Philip J. Ayres attributes this misunderstanding to Vickers, whose publicity he calls "disingenuous".)

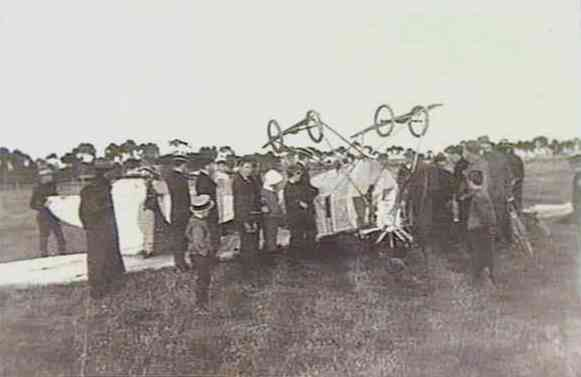
The wreckage of the plane after it crashed at Cheltenham Racecourse in Adelaide

=== Crash ===
A series of public demonstrations were planned in Australia to assist in fund-raising, the first of which was scheduled for 5 October 1911 at the Cheltenham Racecourse in Adelaide. During a test flight the day before, excessive pressure in the fuel tank caused it to rupture, almost blinding Watkins. That problem resolved, Watkins took Frank Wild, whom Mawson had hired to command a support base during the expedition, on another test flight the morning of the demonstration. In Watkins' account, which he addressed to Vickers' Aviation Department, he wrote: "[we were] about 200 ft. up. I got into a fierce tremor, and then into an air pocket, and was brought down about 100 ft., got straight, and dropped into another, almost a vacuum. That finished it. We hit the ground with an awful crash, both wings damaged, one cylinder broken, and the Nose bent up, the tail in half, etc."

Although the two men were only slightly injured, the plane was damaged beyond repair. Mawson decided to salvage the plane by converting it into a motorised sledge. He fitted the skis, and removed the wings and most of the sheathing to save weight. In his official account of the expedition, The Home of the Blizzard, Mawson wrote that the advantages of this "air-tractor sledge" were expected to be "speed, steering control, and comparative safety from crevasses owing to the great length of the runners". No longer needing a pilot, and believing him to be responsible for the crash, Mawson dismissed Watkins.

The air-tractor sledge was taken to Hobart, where the expedition ship SY Aurora was being loaded. It was secured on board in a crate lined with tin, which weighed far more than the sledge itself, on top of the ship's forecastle and two boat-skids. To fuel the sledge, along with the motor launch and the Wireless equipment, the Aurora also carried 4,000 imperial gallons (18,000 L) of benzine and 1,300 imperial gallons (5,900 L) of kerosene. Fully loaded, the ship left Hobart on 2 December 1911.

== In Antarctica ==
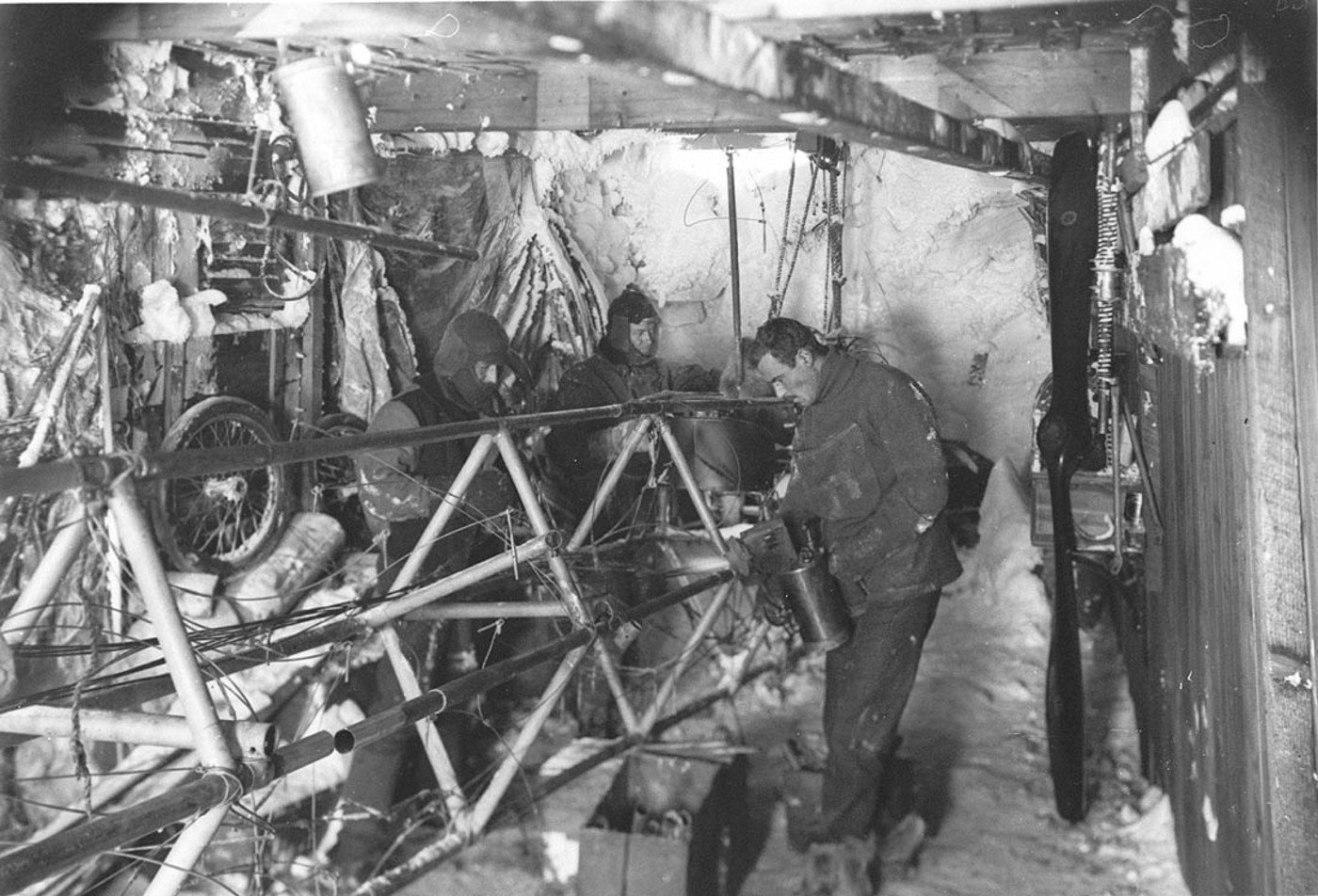
Bob Bage, Belgrave Edward Sutton Ninnis and Frank Bickerton work on the air-tractor sledge in its hangar

The Aurora reached the Antarctic mainland on 8 January 1912, after a two-week stop on Macquarie Island to establish a wireless relay station and research base. The expedition's main base was established in Adélie Land, at Cape Denison in Commonwealth Bay. (Note: During the voyage south, Mawson consolidated the planned third base into his own main base; the remaining Western Base party, under Wild, was established on the Shackleton Ice Shelf. The expedition party at Cape Denison later discovered their base was situated at one of the windiest places on earth; Mawson later wrote that he was "quite sure that anybody who had been out in [the wind] for a few minutes would gladly exchange for hell.") While the Aurora was unloading, a violent whirlwind lifted the 300-pound (140 kg) lid off the air-tractor's crate, throwing it 50 yards (46 m). The main hut was erected immediately, but the strong winds meant that work on the air-tractor's hangar was delayed until March. When the winds abated, a 10-foot (3.0 m) by 35-foot (11 m) hangar was constructed next to the main hut, from empty packing cases.

Bickerton began work on the air-tractor sledge on 14 April 1912. His first job was to repair the sledge, which had been damaged in transit when a violent storm hit the Aurora. A giant wave had slammed into the crate containing the sledge, driving the fuselage 4 feet (1.2 m) through its side. With the repair completed, Bickerton began the serious work of converting the plane into a sledge. He constructed brakes from a pair of geological drills, and a steering system from the landing gear. Bickerton painted the engine and fuel tank black to absorb heat better and protect them from freezing. By June he had the engine running properly, and during a lull in the winds in early September he fitted the skis. Finally, he raised the fuselage 5 feet (1.5 m) off the ground to allow the propeller free movement.

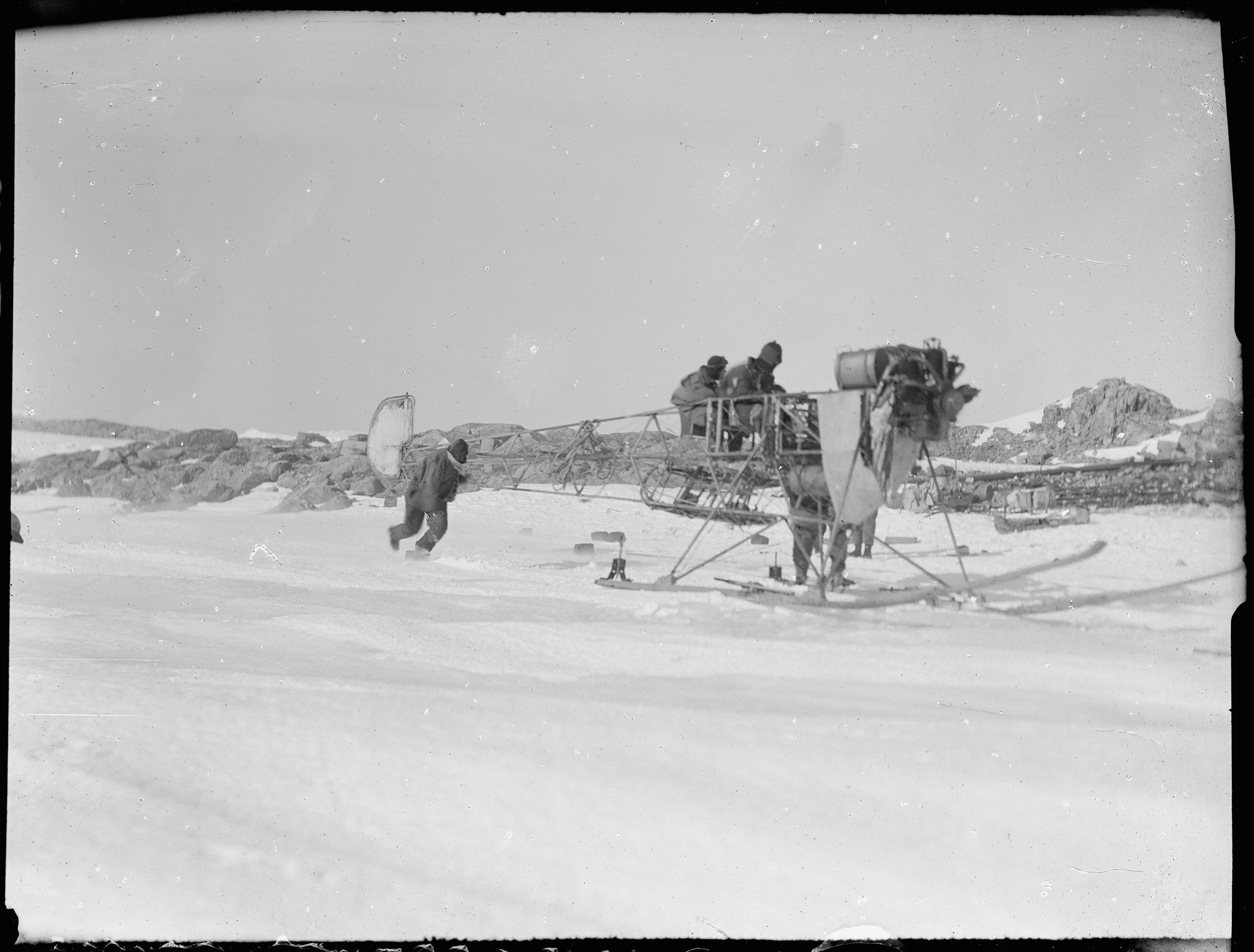
The air-tractor sledge in motion

On 27 October 1912, Mawson outlined the summer sledging program. Seven sledging parties would depart from Cape Denison, surveying the coast and interior of Adélie Land and neighbouring King George V Land. They were required to return to the base by 15 January, when the Aurora was due to depart; any later, it was feared, and she would be trapped by ice. Bickerton was to lead one of the parties, which would use the air-tractor to haul four sledges and explore the coast to the west of the hut. Most of the parties left in early November, but Bickerton's Western party delayed until December, in the hope of avoiding the ferocious winter winds. Work on the air-tractor sledge was delayed by the fierce winds, and the first trial took place on 15 November, between the main base and Aladdin's Cave—a depot which had been established on the plateau above Cape Denison. The air-tractor reached a speed of 20 miles per hour (32 km/h), covering the 5 miles (8.0 km), expedition member Charles Laseron recorded, "in great style". Soon, the sledge began hauling cargo up the slope, laying depots for the summer sledging parties.

=== Broken ===
The Western party left Cape Denison on 3 December 1912. Accompanying Bickerton and the air-tractor were cartographer Alfred Hodgeman and surgeon Leslie Whetter. The air-tractor made slow progress hauling its train of sledges, and about 10 miles (16 km) out from the base its engine began experiencing difficulty. Bickerton shut it down and the three set up camp. At 4 am the next morning the party set off again, but the engine continued to struggle; oil ejected from an idle cylinder and the cylinder's lack of compression led Bickerton to suspect broken piston rings to be the root of the problem. This would take only a matter of hours to fix. As he later recorded, "These thoughts were brought to a sudden close by the engine, without any warning, pulling up with such a jerk that the propeller was smashed. On moving the latter, something fell into the oil in the crank-case and fizzled, while the propeller could only be swung through an angle of about 30 [degrees]."

The party continued without the air-tractor, man-hauling the sledges to a point 158 miles (254 km) west of Cape Denison, and returned to base on 18 January 1913. Mawson's Far Eastern Party failed to return, and six men, including Bickerton, remained for an extra winter. On 8 February, just hours after Aurora left Commonwealth Bay after waiting for three weeks, Mawson staggered alone into base, his colleagues Belgrave Edward Sutton Ninnis and Xavier Mertz dead. (Note: The party had used sledge dogs to explore the land beyond the Mertz and Ninnis Glaciers to the east of Cape Denison. 310 miles (500 km) from base, Ninnis and the sledge he was walking beside were lost when they broke through the lid of a crevasse. Their supplies severely compromised, Mawson and Mertz struggled back west, using the remaining sledge dogs to supplement their scarce rations. About 100 miles (160 km) from Cape Denison, Mertz succumbed to the combined effects of starvation and food poisoning; the dogs' livers contained dangerously high levels of vitamin A. Mawson pushed on alone, and reached base in very poor health; much of the skin on his lower body had peeled off, his hair was falling out, and he was experiencing digestive problems. The Aurora had arrived in Commonwealth Bay on 13 January 1913 and waited for the sledging parties to return. However, her master, John King Davis, was concerned about the encroaching ice, and left for Wild's party on 8 February.) As Mawson was being nursed back to health, Bickerton dragged the air-tractor sledge back to base to diagnose the reason for its failure. He found that the freezing conditions had caused the engine oil to congeal, jamming the pistons. He abandoned the sledge at Boat Harbour, next to the base. When Aurora returned to Cape Denison for the final time on 13 December 1913, only the engine and propeller were taken back to Australia.

== Recovery efforts ==
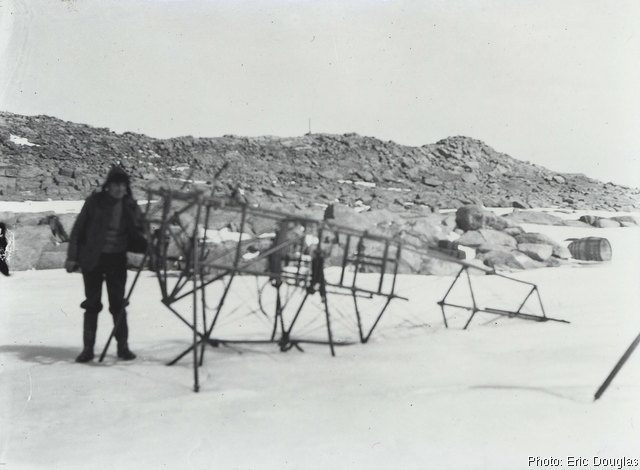
The frame of the air-tractor in 1931

The bill for the plane remained unpaid. In 1914 Vickers reminded Mawson, who had apparently forgotten the outstanding debt. Mawson wrote to Vickers director Sir Trevor Dawson in November 1916, requesting the company write off the bill as a donation. His company buoyed by armaments contracts, Dawson agreed. The next expedition to take a plane to the Antarctic was Shackleton's 1921–22 Quest Expedition, but the Avro Baby remained grounded owing to missing parts. Not until 16 November 1928—when Hubert Wilkins and Carl Ben Eielson flew for 20 minutes around Deception Island, just over a year before Admiral Richard Evelyn Byrd's first flight over the South Pole—was a plane airborne in the Antarctic.

The frame of the air-tractor sledge remained on the ice at Boat Harbour where Bickerton had left it. The last expedition to Cape Denison to see the frame was in 1976; the next expedition, in 1981, could find no trace of it. The ice in that location does not move, and the implication is that the frame sank through the ice. It is therefore possible the frame is still there.

In 2007-8 a team from the Mawson's Huts Foundation began to search for the remnants of the plane. Using photographs from 1913, 1931 and 1976 it was possible to derive transits between the frame and distant objects which located the frame to a small area of ice about 50 m from the hut. Comparison with a 1931 photograph by Frank Hurley confirmed this location.

The following summer (2008–9), the team extensively surveyed the area where they believed the air-tractor to be, using ground-penetrating radar. A 3-metre deep trench was dug in a promising area, but nothing was found except fragments of seaweed indicating the overlying ice must have melted sometime in the past. Temperature records from the nearby Dumont d'Urville Station showed that there had been extended periods (each of about six weeks) of above average temperatures in 1976 and 1981, suggesting the ice around the harbour could have melted. Dr Chris Henderson, the leader of the team, believes "the frame sank in situ to the rock surface, three metres below the present ice surface".

Next year (the 2009–10 season) further search was undertaken using differential GPS, bathymetry equipment, ice augers, a magnetometer and a metal detector (whose sensor was placed down the ice auger holes after drilling). The ice showed signs of having extensively melted in the past, was about 3 metres thick and covering smooth rock which extended Northwards to become the harbour bottom. Visual examination of the harbour bottom during the bathymetry survey did not reveal any fragments of the frame in the first 30 metres of the harbour.

The most significant findings from the ice survey were a positive reading from the metal detector, coupled with a significant echo from the Ground Penetrating Radar, both from the small area where the frame is assumed to have sunk.

Parts of the Air Tractor are already known to exist: The Australian Antarctic Division has one wheel from the frame, and its ice-rudder – both of which were found in the harbour. In January 2009 the remains of a seat from the air-tractor were found in rocks near the hut, about 200 metres (660 ft) from where the team believes the frame to be buried. On 1 January 2010, a day of unusually low tide, 4 small capping pieces from the end section of the tail were found by the edge of the harbour. The tail and a section of fuselage had been removed from the rest of the air-tractor before it was abandoned in 1913, therefore this discovery did not shed much light on the location of the rest of the frame, but it suggests that "the frame, or parts of it, can survive for nearly 100 years in this environment".

The team returned to Cape Denison over the 2010–11 summer, but the crash of a French helicopter near Dumont d'Urville Station in October 2010 forced deployment of a much reduced team with no resources to continue the search.

The findings to date (2011) suggest that metal object(s) exist at a depth of 3 metres, on rock, in the location where the frame was last known to have been seen in 1976. This is likely to be the remains of Mawson's Air Tractor, but confirmation awaits a future opportunity.

== See also ==
- Heroic Age of Antarctic Exploration
- Aerosled, propeller-driven sledge
- Hydrocopter
- Screw-propelled vehicle

== Notes and references ==
=== Bibliography ===
- Ayres, Philip J. (1999), Mawson: a life, Carlton South, Victoria: Miegunyah Press at Melbourne University Press, ISBN 0-522-84811-7
- Bickel, Lennard (2000) [1977], Mawson's Will: The Greatest Polar Survival Story Ever Written, Hanover, New Hampshire: Steerforth Press, ISBN 1-58642-000-3
- Burke, David (1994), Moments of terror: the story of Antarctic aviation, Kensington, New South Wales: New South Wales University Press, ISBN 0-86840-157-9
- Fisher, Margery; Fisher, James (1957), Shackleton, London: James Barrie Books, OCLC 1337562
- Henderson, Chris (2010), "The search for Mawson's air tractor", Australian Antarctic Magazine, 18: 30–32, archived from the original on 2 June 2011
- Mawson, Douglas (1996) [1915], The Home of the Blizzard: the story of the Australasian Antarctic Expedition, 1911–1914, Kent Town, South Australia: Wakefield Press, ISBN 1-86254-377-1
- Riffenburgh, Beau (2009) [2008], Racing with death: Douglas Mawson—Antarctic Explorer, London, New York and Berlin: Bloomsbury, ISBN 978-0-7475-9671-4
- Robinson, Bethany (November 2004), "Douglas Mawson and his 'Wingless Wonder' headed for the Antarctic in 1911", Aviation History, 15 (2): 20, 71–73
