= Belgrave Ninnis =

Royal Navy officer and explorer

- Born: 1 September 1837; London, England
- Died: 18 June 1922 (aged 84); Streatham, England
- Resting place: West Norwood Cemetery
- Other name: Belgrave Ninnis Sr.
- Children: 4, including Belgrave Jr.
- Military career
- Allegiance: United Kingdom
- Branch: (United Kingdom) Royal Navy
- Service years: 1861–97
- Rank: Inspector-General
- Awards: Arctic Medal; Sir Gilbert Blane's Gold Medal
- Other work: Surveyor; Arctic explorer Freemason

Inspector-General Belgrave Ninnis Sr. CVO KStJ FRGS FSA MD (1 September 1837 – 18 June 1922) was a Royal Navy surgeon, surveyor, Arctic explorer, and leading Freemason, from London. He graduated as a Doctor of Medicine from the University of St Andrews in 1861, and the same year entered the navy as an Assistant Surgeon. From 1864 to 1866, Ninnis served as part of a surveying expedition to the Northern Territory of South Australia, helping to chart the area to the west of the Adelaide River and returning biological specimens to Adelaide for study. In 1867 Ninnis was appointed to Greenwich Hospital (later the Royal Naval College, Greenwich), and in 1875 he joined the British Arctic Expedition under Captain Sir George Nares, serving as Staff-Surgeon on HMS Discovery. When disease spread among the expedition's dogs, Ninnis was charged with investigating the cause; his findings later formed the basis of a published work. At the conclusion of the expedition in 1876 he received the Arctic Medal for his service, and was promoted to Fleet-Surgeon.

In his later career Ninnis served both on ships and in hospitals. He received Sir Gilbert Blane's gold medal in 1879, was promoted to Deputy Inspector-General in 1883, was appointed Principal Medical Officer at Melville Naval Hospital in 1892, and was selected as a Knight of Grace of the Venerable Order of Saint John in 1895. Upon his retirement in 1897 he was promoted to Inspector-General, and in 1900 and 1902 served as President of the Section of the Navy, Army, and Ambulance of the British Medical Association. He was made a Commander of the Royal Victorian Order (CVO) in 1912. Ninnis was initiated into the Freemasons 1872, was a founder of several Lodges, and in 1901 became a Past Grand Deacon of England. He was the father of Belgrave Edward Sutton Ninnis, an explorer who was lost down a crevasse during the 1911–14 Australasian Antarctic Expedition.

== Career ==
=== Early career ===
Ninnis graduated from the University of St Andrews as a Doctor of Medicine on 2 January 1861, and became a Member of the Royal College of Surgeons—MCRS; a professional qualification—in April of the same year. On 1 August, he entered the Royal Navy Medical Service, as an Assistant Surgeon, and was appointed to HMS Pantaloon. (Note: Ninnis' biography published in the British Medical Journal upon his retirement in 1897 suggests he entered the Navy at the rank of Surgeon.) In October 1862 Ninnis was transferred to the navy's flagship HMS Victory, then moored in Portsmouth. He was posted aboard HMS Curacoa, assigned to the Australian Station, in 1863.

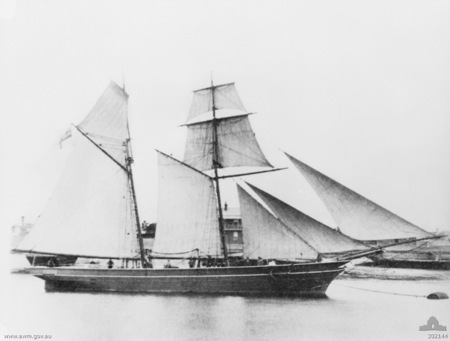
The schooner HMS Beatrice, on which Ninnis served as naturalist during the survey expedition to the Northern Territory

In 1864, he was selected to serve as naturalist on a survey expedition to the Northern Territory of South Australia, aboard HMS Beatrice. The expedition, under Boyle Travers Finniss, was charged with surveying the coast in the area of the Adelaide River, with the aim of selecting a site for a future territory capital. Together with W. P. Auld, Ninnis was the first to survey the area to the west of the river, around what is now Darwin. In his role as naturalist, Ninnis collected specimens of reptiles and birds, which he presented to the South Australian Institute (later the South Australian Museum), and timber, which was donated to the Adelaide Botanic Garden. Ninnis later reported to the Adelaide Philosophical Society on geological findings; "the coast at the Northern Territory," he said, "was generally composed of red and grey sandstone, with small quantities of quartz."

Writing in the South Australian Register, George William Francis, director of the Botanic Garden, said that the 32 species of timber Ninnis had collected settled "that important question, is there timber around [the proposed capital] or not?" Noting that the member of the expedition originally intended to return biological specimens to Adelaide had failed to do so, Francis wrote that "we are very much indebted to this gentleman [Ninnis] who has thus supplied us at a time when we have failed in obtaining information through the appointed channel." Upon the conclusion of the expedition in 1866, Ninnis received the thanks of the Parliament of South Australia for his work. His research on the expedition later formed the basis of a published work, Remarks on the Natural History, Meteorology, and Native Population of Northern Australia.

=== British Arctic Expedition ===
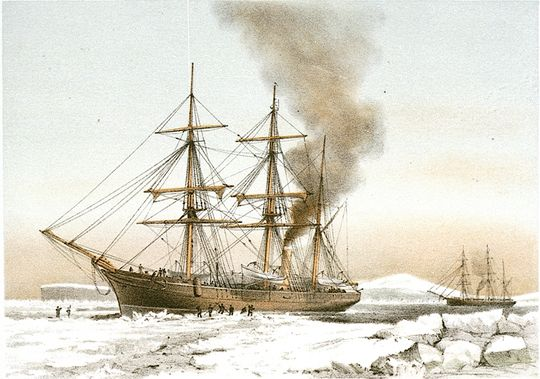
HMS Discovery and HMS Alert in the Arctic during the 1875–76 expedition

Upon his return to Britain, Ninnis qualified in January 1867 for the title of Surgeon in the Royal Navy by passing examinations at the Royal College of Surgeons; the following month he was appointed to the Royal Naval Hospital in Greenwich, where he remained until 1869. On 21 December 1874 he was promoted to Staff-Surgeon Second Class. In May 1875 he was appointed to HMS Discovery, one of two ships—the other HMS Alert—which comprised the British Arctic Expedition, led by Captain Sir George Nares. The expedition aimed to be the first to reach the North Pole, pushing north through Smith Sound, between Ellesmere Island and Greenland. The two ships made slow progress up the sound, repeatedly halted by dense pack ice. During August of the first year, the expedition's Greenland Dogs began to show signs of disease; the dogs experienced fits and "madness", owing, it was assumed, "to close confinement, wet decks, and want of natural exercise." Ninnis and Fleet-Surgeon Thomas Colon of the Alert were charged with investigating the disease. Ninnis' report to Nares noted the disease's similarity to rabies, "but there is no instance recorded in Greenland of human beings who have been bitten having suffered from hydrophobia [a symptom of advanced rabies], and the recovery of the animals in some instances is entirely opposed to the recorded experience of true rabies."

On 26 August the two ships parted; Alert continued to push north while Discovery waited in reserve. Ninnis' biological work then extended to horticulture. He collected wheat seeds left in the area by the Polaris expedition four years previously, and planted them—together with mustard, cress and pea seeds—between the decks of the Discovery. In May of the second year they were transplanted to the shore, under glass. According to Robert Johnston, in his 1877 summary of the expedition, "This experiment succeeded very well; but, evidently, such an attempt at fancy gardening, under difficulties, could not be relied on to supply the wants of an entire ship's crew."

The expedition returned to England in October 1876, having failed to reach the pole. The gains it had made had not been without cost; three men had died from scurvy alone. One of these deaths had occurred on a sledging party from Alert, the remaining two on Discovery, from which there had been no major sledging. A Committee of Inquiry investigating the expedition determined a lack of fresh lime juice had triggered the outbreak. Even so, fresh meat, of which there was a plentiful supply near Discovery, could have staved off the disease. Publicly, Nares defended his surgeons, Ninnis included:

Much as the attack of scurvy which visited us is to be regretted, it proved how valuable were the services of Fleet-Surgeon Thomas Colan, M.D., and Staff-Surgeon Belgrave Ninnis, M.D., who were so ably assisted by Surgeons Edward Lawton Moss, M.D., and Richard William Coppinger, M.D. These officers are each of great talent and high character ... Any reward that it is in the power of their lordships to bestow on these gentlemen could not be given to more careful or zealous officers.

For his work on the expedition, Ninnis was awarded the Arctic Medal, and promoted to Fleet-Surgeon. He later published a report, Diseases Incidental to the Eskimo Dogs of Smith's Sound: Diagnosis and Treatment, on his findings during the expedition.

=== Later career ===
Ninnis spent the remainder of his career working on ships and in hospitals. His surgical notes from at least part of this time survive; in November 1880, for example, while serving aboard HMS Garnet, he recorded a failed attempt to revive a drowning victim, James Farley: "Brandy injected into the rectum and strychnine at the epigastrium [the area immediately below the heart], brandy and ammonia to wet his mouth." In 1879 he was awarded Sir Gilbert Blane's gold medal, an honour reserved for Royal Navy medical officers. In 1883 he received his final active promotion, to Deputy Inspector-General. He was appointed Principal Medical Officer at Melville Naval Hospital, Chatham in 1892, and three years later was selected as a Knight of Grace to the Venerable Order of Saint John. He retired on 1 September 1897, with an honorary promotion to Inspector-General.

He continued to be active after his retirement from the Navy, twice serving—in 1900 and 1902—as President of the Section of the Navy, Army, and Ambulance of the British Medical Association. In July 1900, serving in this capacity, he delivered an introductory address at the annual meeting of the association. In the address, while arguing that light and fresh air were important for the treatment of wounded sailors, noted that they could "only be obtained in sufficient quantity above the water-line, and to place the sick quarters above the water-line, amidst the hurly-burly of a sea fight, traversed by projectiles and wrecked by exploding shells, is of course out of the question, even supposing that sufficient space could be spared." Instead, he argued for dedicated hospital ships, which "during an action ... would keep out of range but sufficiently close to collect the wounded when the fight was over, and sailing under the regulations of the Geneva Convention would be free from molestation or capture." A related article by Ninnis, "The Treatment of Wounded at Sea", was published in the Philadelphia Medical Journal in August 1900, and he expanded on the idea of hospital ships in a 1905 paper to the British Medical Association.

Ninnis presented another paper at the 1908 annual meeting of the association, entitled "The Position of St. John Ambulance Brigade as Regards Mobilization", in his capacity as Chief Commissioner St. John Ambulance Brigade. (Note: Perhaps in the same capacity, Ninnis had the previous year "inquired whether the St. John Ambulance could, in case of war, take charge of the military hospitals of the United Kingdom and the Channel Islands, and so release the Royal Army Medical Corps for service abroad.") On 14 June 1912, at St James's Palace, he was made a Commander of the Royal Victorian Order (CVO) by King George V.

Ninnis died in Streatham on 18 June 1922, aged 84. He was a fellow of the Royal Geographical Society and the Society of Antiquaries, and a member of the Army and Navy Club, the Royal Navy Medical Club, and the Folklore Society. In addition to the works previously mentioned, he was the author of a published work entitled Statistical and Nosological Report, with Remarks on the Sanitary Condition of the Welsh Colony of Chubut, South America.

== Freemasons ==
Ninnis was initiated into the Freemasons in 1872. In 1901 he became a Past Grand Deacon of England, having previously been a Grand Standard Bearer of England. He was a Founder of the Quadratic Lodge, Hampton Court; the Æsculapius Lodge, London; the Navy Lodge, London; and the Belgrave Chapter, London. He was a Past Master (a former Worshipful Master, the senior officer of a Masonic Lodge) of the Quadratic Lodge; the Æsculapius Lodge; the Prince of Wales Lodge; the Phoenix Lodge, Jamaica; and the Pentangle Lodge, Kent. He was a member of the Orders of Knights Templar and the Knights of Malta. Ninnis was a Life Governor of the Royal Masonic Benevolent Institution, a Vice President of the Royal Masonic School for Boys, and a Vice Patron of the Royal Masonic School for Girls.

== Family ==
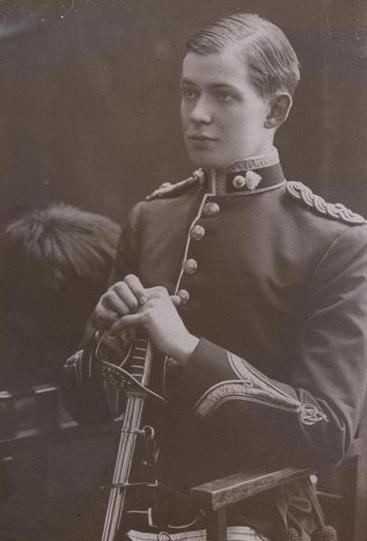
Ninnis' third son Belgrave Edward Sutton Ninnis

Belgrave Ninnis was the fourth son of Paul Ninnis, originally of Cornwall. He was married to Ada Jane Sutton, with whom he had three sons and one daughter. One son, Walter Melville Ninnis, died, aged 17 months, of pneumonia, on 12 September 1886.

Ninnis was the father of Belgrave Edward Sutton Ninnis, a Lieutenant in the Royal Fusiliers and Antarctic explorer. B. E. S. Ninnis accompanied the 1911–14 Australasian Antarctic Expedition, under Douglas Mawson, as a dog handler. Along with Mawson and Xavier Mertz, he formed the Far Eastern Party, using sledge dogs to explore the area around the expedition's base in Adélie Land. On 14 December 1912, B. E. S. Ninnis died when the sledge he was walking beside broke through the snow lid of a crevasse. When news of his death reached Australia in March 1913, several Australian newspapers—including The Advertiser, the Western Argus and The Sydney Morning Herald—ran biographies of Belgrave Ninnis, noting his surveying work in the Northern Territory and Arctic exploration. (Note: Ninnis senior was described in the Advertiser as "an old Arctic explorer and an authority on Arctic exploration, the Esquimaux, and also on their dogs, both for training and care.") When Mawson returned to Australia a year later, a telegram was sent on behalf of the Australian people to Ninnis senior, condoling him on his "great loss, but congratulating you on your son's imperishable fame." Ninnis replied the following day, "Grateful thanks to yourself and people of Australia for sympathetic message."
