= Alfred Hodgeman =

Australian architect

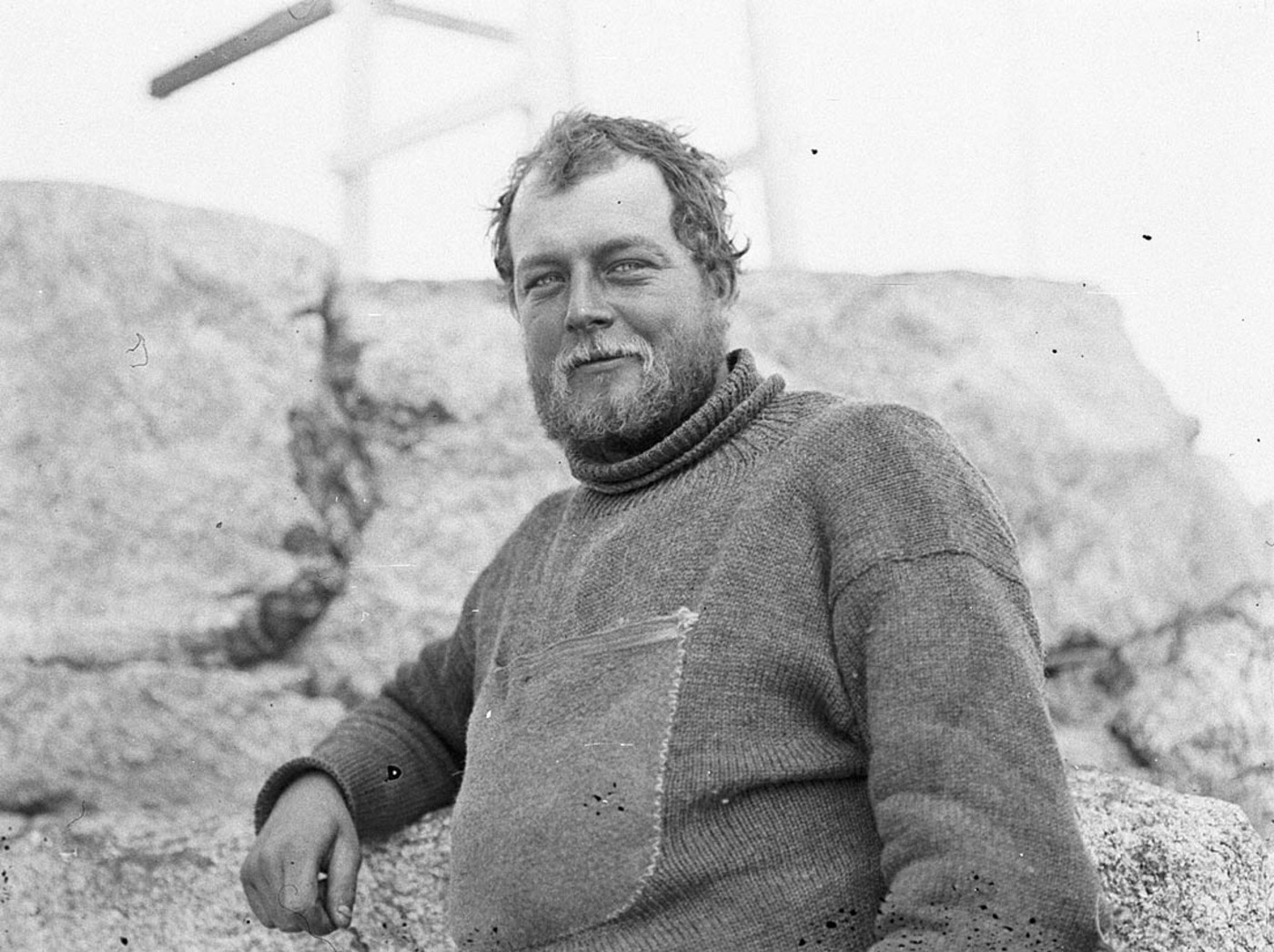
- Alfred Hodgeman in Antarctica, 1911-1914, photo by Frank Hurley
- Born: 8 August 1885; Adelaide, Australia
- Died: January 1964; England
- Occupation: Architect
- Known for: Australasian Antarctic Expedition Gallipoli campaign
- Spouse(s): Vera St John LeBlond, married 1921

Alfred Hodgeman (8 August 1885 – January 1964) was an Australian architect and cartographer known for his involvement in the Australasian Antarctic expedition.

== Biography ==
Alfred James Hodgeman was born in Adelaide, South Australia on 8 August 1885. His parents were Alfred Hodgeman and Helen Davidson Pennington.

He was employed by the South Australian government as a draughtsman and was later an architect.

Hodgeman was asked by Sir Douglas Mawson to design the huts for the Australasian Antarctic Expedition and selected to join the expedition. The huts were prefabricated in sections to allow for transport to Antarctica. As part of his role, Hodgeman oversaw the construction of the main hut at the main base and took part in several sledging expeditions, recording routes taken, coastlines and topography. He also remained behind awaiting the return of the Far Eastern Party, Mawson, Belgrave Edward Sutton Ninnis and Xavier Mertz. Mertz and Ninnis died on the journey and only Mawson returned alive; Hodgeman designed the plaque and helped to construct a Memorial Cross for Mertz and Ninnis. The Hodgeman Islands are named for him.

After his return, he travelled to London at Mawson's request to assist with the preparation of plans and drawings for Mawson's publication about the expedition, Home of the Blizzard. He enlisted in World War I and saw active service, including at Gallipoli and in Macedonia.

He settled in England and married Vera St John LeBlond in 1921. The couple had three children. In the 1920s, Hodgeman was invited by Mawson to join his second Antarctic expedition, the British Australian and New Zealand Antarctic Research Expedition, but declined the invitation. During World War II he worked at the Portsmouth naval base and also served in the Home Guard. He remained in England, and never returned to Australia.

Hodgeman died in January 1964.

== See also ==
- Heroic Age of Antarctic Exploration
- List of polar explorers
