= Hypervitaminosis A =

Toxic effects of ingesting too much vitamin A

- Forms of preformed vitamin A in the body
- Specialty: Toxicology

Hypervitaminosis A refers to the toxic effects of ingesting too much preformed vitamin A (retinyl esters, retinol, and retinal). Symptoms arise as a result of altered bone metabolism and altered metabolism of other fat-soluble vitamins. Hypervitaminosis A is believed to have occurred in early humans, and the problem has persisted throughout human history. Toxicity results from ingesting too much preformed vitamin A from foods (such as liver), supplements, or prescription medications and can be prevented by ingesting no more than the recommended daily amount.

Diagnosis can be difficult as serum retinol is not sensitive to toxic levels of vitamin A, but there are effective tests available. Hypervitaminosis A is usually treated by stopping intake of the offending food(s), supplement(s), or medication. Most people make a full recovery. High intake of provitamin carotenoids (such as beta-carotene) from vegetables and fruits does not cause hypervitaminosis A.

== Signs and symptoms ==
Symptoms may include:

- Changes in consciousness
- Decreased appetite
- Dizziness
- Vision changes, double vision (in young children)
- Drowsiness
- Headache
- Irritability
- Nausea
- Vomiting

Signs

- Poor weight gain (in infants and children)
- Skin and hair changes
- Cracking at corners of the mouth
- Hair loss (alopecia)
- Higher sensitivity to sunlight
- Swelling of lips (cheilitis)
- Dryness of lips, mouth, eyes, and inside the nose
- Skin peeling, itching
- Yellow discoloration of the skin (aurantiasis cutis)
- Abnormal softening of the skull bone (craniotabes in infants and children)
- Blurred vision
- Bone pain or swelling
- Bulging fontanelle (in infants)
- Gastric mucosal calcinosis
- Heart valve calcification
- Hypercalcemia
- Increased intracranial pressure manifesting as cerebral edema, papilledema, and headache (may be referred to as idiopathic intracranial hypertension)
- Liver damage
- Premature epiphyseal closure
- Spontaneous fracture
- Uremic pruritus

== Causes ==
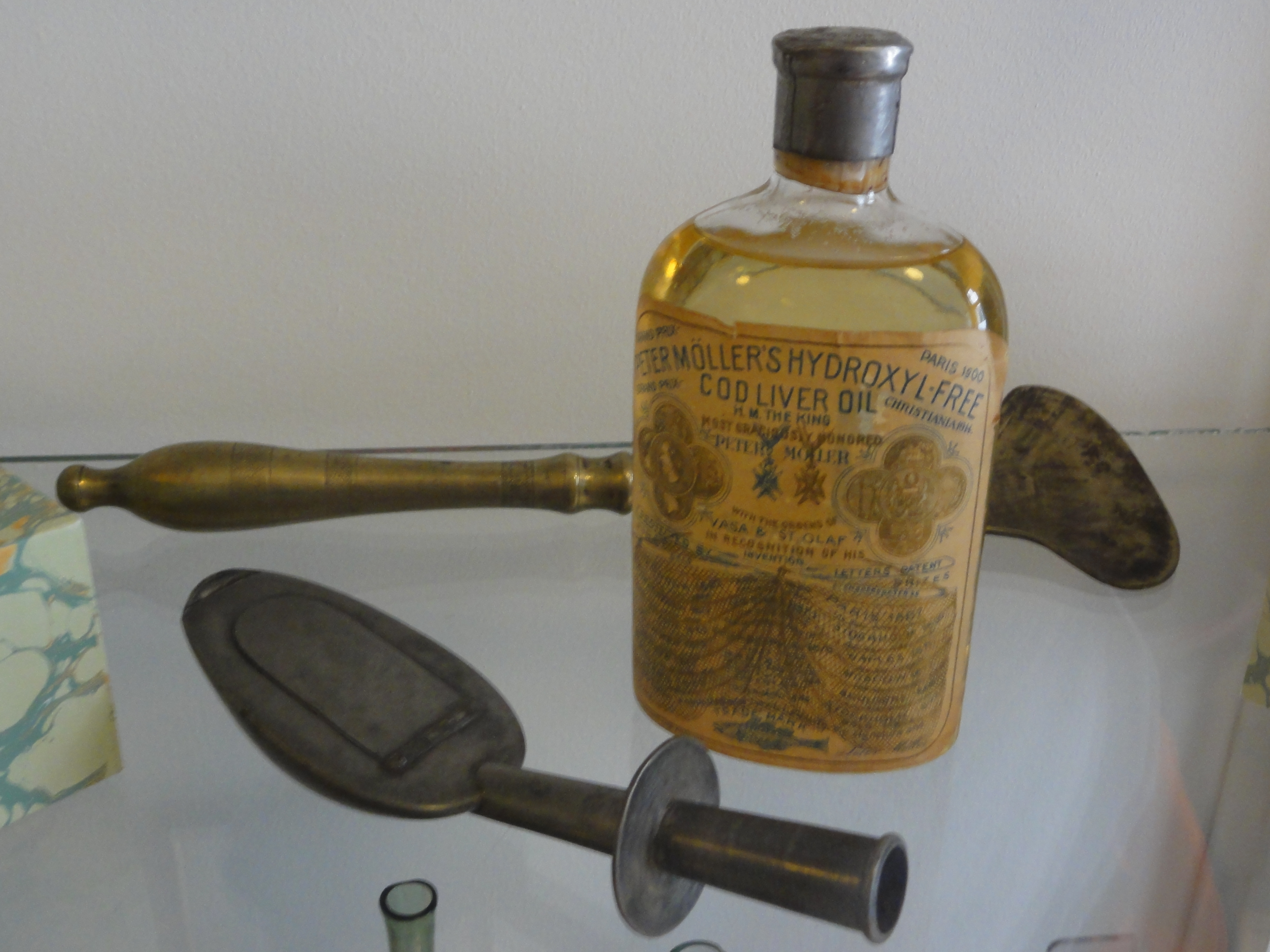
Cod liver oil, a potentially toxic source of vitamin A. Hypervitaminosis A can result from ingestion of too much vitamin A from diet (rare), supplements, or prescription medications.

Hypervitaminosis A results from excessive intake of preformed vitamin A. Genetic variations in tolerance to vitamin A intake may occur, so the toxic dose will not be the same for everyone. Children are particularly sensitive to vitamin A, with daily intakes of 1500 IU/kg body weight reportedly leading to toxicity.

=== Types of vitamin A ===
- It is "largely impossible" for provitamin carotenoids, such as beta-carotene, to cause toxicity, as their conversion to retinol is highly regulated. No vitamin A toxicity has ever been reported from ingestion of excessive amounts. Overconsumption of beta-carotene can only cause carotenosis, a harmless and reversible cosmetic condition in which the skin turns orange.
- Preformed vitamin A absorption and storage in the liver occur very efficiently until a pathologic condition develops. When ingested, 70–90% of preformed vitamin A is absorbed.

=== Sources of toxicity ===
- Diet – Liver is high in vitamin A. The liver of certain animals, including the polar bear, bearded seal, and walrus, is particularly toxic (see Liver (food) § Poisoning). It has been estimated that consumption of 500 grams (18 oz) of polar bear liver would result in an acute toxic dose for humans.
- Supplements – Dietary supplements can be toxic when taken above recommended dosages.
- Cod liver oil - According to the United States Department of Agriculture, a tablespoon (13.6 grams or 14.8 mL) of cod liver oil contains 4,080 μg of vitamin A. The tolerable upper intake level (UL) is 3000 μg/day for adults, 600 μg/day for children ages 1–3 years and 900 μg/day for children ages 4–8 years, so for all ages, but especially for young children, a tablespoon a day exceeds the UL.

=== Types of toxicity ===
- Acute toxicity occurs over hours or a few days.
- Chronic toxicity results from adult daily intakes greater than 25,000 IU for 6 years or longer and more than 100,000 IU for 6 months or longer.

== Mechanism ==
Retinol is absorbed and stored in the liver very efficiently until a pathologic condition develops.

=== Delivery to tissues ===
==== Absorption ====
When ingested, 70–90% of preformed vitamin A is absorbed. Water-miscible, emulsified and solid forms of vitamin A supplements are more toxic than oil-based supplements.

==== Storage ====
Eighty to ninety percent of the total body reserves of preformed vitamin A are in the liver (with 80–90% of this amount being stored in hepatic stellate cells and the remaining 10–20% being stored in hepatocytes). Fat is another significant storage site, while the lungs and kidneys may also be capable of storage.

==== Transport ====
Until recently, it was thought that the sole important retinoid delivery pathway to tissues involved retinol bound to retinol-binding protein (RBP4). More recent findings, however, indicate that retinoids can be delivered to tissues through multiple overlapping delivery pathways, involving chylomicrons, very low-density lipoprotein (VLDL) and low-density lipoprotein (LDL), retinoic acid bound to albumin, water-soluble β-glucuronides of retinol and retinoic acid, and provitamin A carotenoids.

The range of serum retinol concentrations under normal conditions is 1–3 μmol/L. Elevated amounts of retinyl ester (i.e., >10% of total circulating vitamin A) in the fasting state have been used as markers for chronic hypervitaminosis A in humans. Candidate mechanisms for this increase include decreased hepatic uptake of vitamin A and the leaking of esters into the bloodstream from saturated hepatic stellate cells.

=== Effects ===
Effects include increased bone turnover and altered metabolism of fat-soluble vitamins. More research is needed to fully elucidate the effects.

==== Increased bone turnover ====
Retinoic acid suppresses osteoblast activity and stimulates osteoclast formation in vitro, resulting in increased bone resorption and decreased bone formation. It is likely to exert this effect by binding to specific nuclear receptors (members of the retinoic acid receptor or retinoid X receptor nuclear transcription family) which are found in every cell (including osteoblasts and osteoclasts).

This change in bone turnover is likely to be the reason for numerous effects seen in hypervitaminosis A, such as hypercalcemia and numerous bone changes such as bone loss that potentially leads to osteoporosis, spontaneous bone fractures, altered skeletal development in children, skeletal pain, radiographic changes, and bone lesions.

==== Altered fat-soluble vitamin metabolism ====
Preformed vitamin A is fat-soluble and high levels have been reported to affect the metabolism of the other fat-soluble vitamins D, E, and K.

The toxic effects of preformed vitamin A might be related to altered vitamin D metabolism, concurrent ingestion of substantial amounts of vitamin D, or binding of vitamin A to receptor heterodimers. Antagonistic and synergistic interactions between these two vitamins have been reported, as they relate to skeletal health.

Stimulation of bone resorption by vitamin A has been reported to be independent of its effects on vitamin D.

===== Mitochondrial toxicity =====
Preformed vitamin A and retinoids exert several toxic effects regarding the redox environment and mitochondrial function.

== Diagnosis ==
=== Retinol concentrations are nonsensitive indicators ===
Assessing vitamin A status in persons with sub-toxicity or toxicity is complicated because serum retinol concentrations are not sensitive indicators in this range of liver vitamin A reserves. The range of serum retinol concentrations under normal conditions is 1–3 μmol/L and, because of homeostatic regulation, that range varies little with widely disparate vitamin A intakes.

=== Retinol esters have been used as markers ===
Retinyl esters can be distinguished from retinol in serum and other tissues and quantified with the use of methods such as high-performance liquid chromatography.

Elevated amounts of retinyl ester (i.e., >10% of total circulating vitamin A) in the fasting state have been used as markers for chronic hypervitaminosis A in humans and monkeys. This increased retinyl ester may be due to decreased hepatic uptake of vitamin A and the leaking of esters into the bloodstream from saturated hepatic stellate cells.

== Prevention ==
Hypervitaminosis A can be prevented by not ingesting more than the US Institute of Medicine Daily Tolerable Upper Level of intake for Vitamin A. This level is for synthetic and natural retinol ester forms of vitamin A. Carotene forms from dietary sources are not toxic. Possible pregnancy, liver disease, high alcohol consumption, and smoking are indications for close monitoring and limitation of vitamin A administration.

=== Daily tolerable upper level ===
| Life stage group category | Upper Level; (μg/day) |
|---|---|
| Infants: 0–6 months; 7–12 months | 600; 600 |
| Children and adolescents: 1–3 years; 4–8 years; 9–13 years; 14–18 years | 600; 900; 1700; 2800 |
| Adults 19–70 years | 3000 |

== Treatment ==
- Stopping high vitamin A intake is the standard treatment. Most people fully recover.
- Phosphatidylcholine (in the form of PPC or DLPC), the substrate for lecithin retinol acyltransferase, which converts retinol into retinyl esters (the storage forms of vitamin A).
- Vitamin E may alleviate hypervitaminosis A.
- Liver transplantation may be a valid option if no improvement occurs.

If liver damage has progressed into fibrosis, synthesizing capacity is compromised and supplementation can replenish PC. However, recovery is dependent on removing the causative agent: halting high vitamin A intake.

== History ==
Vitamin A toxicity is known to be an ancient phenomenon; fossilized skeletal remains of early humans suggest bone abnormalities may have been caused by hypervitaminosis A, as observed in a fossilised leg bone of an individual of Homo erectus, which bears abnormalities similar to those observed in people suffering from an overdose of Vitamin A in the present day.

Vitamin A toxicity has long been known to the Inuit, as they will not eat the liver of polar bears or bearded seals due to them containing dangerous amounts of Vitamin A. It has been known to Europeans since at least 1597 when Gerrit de Veer wrote in his diary that, while taking refuge in the winter in Nova Zemlya, he and his men became severely ill after eating polar bear liver.

It is claimed that, in 1913, Antarctic explorers Douglas Mawson and Xavier Mertz were both poisoned (and Mertz died) from eating the livers of their sled dogs during the Far Eastern Party. Another study suggests, however, that exhaustion and diet change are more likely to have caused the tragedy.

== Other animals ==
Some Arctic animals demonstrate no signs of hypervitaminosis A despite having 10–20 times the level of vitamin A in their livers as non-Arctic animals. These animals are top predators and include the polar bear, Arctic fox, bearded seal, and glaucous gull. Plasma concentrations are maintained in a non-toxic range despite the high liver content.

== See also ==
- Vitamin poisoning
- Far Eastern Party
- Retinoic acid syndrome
- Piblokto
