= Craniotabes =

Softening or thinning of the skull in infants and children

- Cranial bones
- Specialty: Pediatrics

Craniotabes is softening or thinning of the skull in infants and children, which may be normally present in newborns. It is seen mostly in the occipital and parietal bones. The bones are soft, and when pressure is applied they will collapse underneath it. When the pressure is relieved, the bones will usually snap back into place.

== Causes ==
Any condition that affects bone growth, most notably rickets (from vitamin D deficiency), marasmus, syphilis, or thalassemia, can cause craniotabes if present during a time of rapid skull growth (most especially during gestation and infancy). It can be a "normal" feature in premature infants. It is the first sign in children and infants with rickets.

Other conditions which can cause craniotabes include hypervitaminosis A, osteogenesis imperfecta, hydrocephalus, and congenital syphilis.

== Diagnosis ==
Physical examination

The NIH recommends that this condition isn't tested for or treated in normal newborns because the condition is found in approximately 30% of otherwise normal newborns and can usually heal within 2-3 months.

However, recent evidence indicates that vitamin D deficiency in infants can increase the risk of asthma, lower respiratory tract infections, type 1 diabetes, schizophrenia, and decreased bone mass later in life.

== Management ==
Management of craniotabes depends on the cause. The majority of craniotabes occurs in term infants and can be a normal finding. Commonly, craniotabes results from the position of the head inside the uterus weeks prior to delivery. Calcium and Vitamin D levels should be obtained to rule out rickets, and in mothers who have prenatal labs concerning for T. pallidum infection, neonates should be evaluated for congenital syphilis.

== Etymology ==
The term (cranio- + tabes) is derived from the Latin words cranium for skull and tabes for wasting.
