= Belgrave Edward Sutton Ninnis =

British soldier and explorer (1887–1912)

Belgrave Ninnis
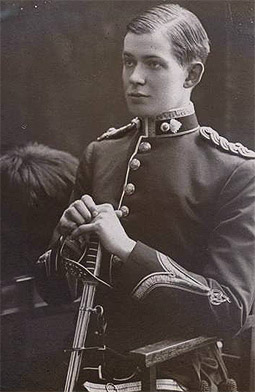
- Born: Belgrave Edward Sutton Ninnis; 22 June 1887; Streatham, Surrey, England, United Kingdom of Great Britain and Ireland (now United Kingdom)
- Died: 14 December 1912 (aged 25); 150km east of Ninnis Glacier, George V Land, Antarctica
- Resting place: 150km East of Ninnis Glacier, George V Land, British Overseas Territories (now Australian Antarctic Territory) Cenotaphs at Cape Denison and Hobart
- Other name: Belgrave Ninnis Jr.
- Known for: Australasian Antarctic expedition
- Father: Belgrave Ninnis Sr.

Lieutenant Belgrave Edward Sutton Ninnis (22 June 1887 – 14 December 1912) was an English officer in the Royal Fusiliers and an Antarctic explorer who was a member of Sir Douglas Mawson's 1911 Australasian Antarctic Expedition.

== Family ==
Ninnis was the son of British arctic explorer Belgrave Ninnis (1837–1922), Inspector Surgeon General of the Royal Navy and member of Captain Sir George Nares' British Arctic Expedition of 1875–1876. Ninnis' cousin, Aubrey Howard Ninnis (1883–1956) was also a part of the Heroic Age of Antarctic Exploration, having briefly been a part of the crew on board the Terra Nova before joining the Ross Sea party contingent of the Imperial Trans-Antarctic Expedition as a purser.

== Antarctica, 1911–1912 ==
Following the fame he achieved on Ernest Shackleton's 1907 Nimrod Expedition to Antarctica, Douglas Mawson travelled to England in early 1910 to raise interest and sponsorship for an Australian Expedition focussed on scientific outcomes. On that trip he purchased the whaler SY Aurora and in London he loaded it with the many items of specialist equipment he was able to obtain there and 48 sledging dogs procured from Greenland. Ninnis joined the Expedition in London as a minder of the Greenland dogs, and sailed with the Aurora on its voyage from London to Sydney commanded by Captain John King Davis. On the trip Ninnis soon formed a close friendship with Dr. Xavier Mertz, a Swiss mountaineer who joined the Expedition in London and who was also appointed to handle the dogs. Ninnis wrote of his deep admiration for Mertz in his diary:

"It would be impossible to exaggerate my admiration for him, and admiration that has been mounting up since we sailed together from London nearly ten months ago. Quite the hardest and strongest man amongst us, he is splendid for all work under trying conditions....He is one of the finest, if not the finest fellow I have ever met, and knowing him and others on this show, notably Mawson, Bick, Madigan, Hurley etc, has done for more me, mentally, morally and physically, than anything else could have done."

As time went on during the expedition, Ninnis would come to view Mertz as an older brother figure. Charles Laseron, the expedition's taxidermist, would write years later:

"The two [Mertz and Ninnis] had joined the Expedition together in London, and had been associated longer and in a more intimate manner than any other members of the Expedition. During the winter months we had all been drawn together, but between Mertz and Ninnis there existed a very deep bond. Mertz, in his warm-hearted impulsive way, had practically adopted Ninnis, and his affection was almost maternal. Ninnis, less demonstrative, reciprocated this to the full, and indeed it was hard to dissociate them in our thoughts. It was always 'Mertz and Ninnis' or 'Ninnis and Mertz', a composite entity, each the complement of the other."

Ninnis was in the 36-man party who set sail from Hobart on 2 December 1911. A base was built at Macquarie Island and a small party of five men were deployed to man a radio relay station and to conduct research. Ninnis landed in Antarctica with the main party at Commonwealth Bay on 8 January 1912, and established the Main Base. The summer was spent building a hut at Cape Denison for the 18-man Adélie Land base party to winter in. Ninnis and Mertz continued their jobs caring for the dogs once the hut was established. Both of the men would also be on a rotated schedule taking turns as cook and watchmen, respectively. Ninnis, in a diary entry dated 4 August 1912, detailed how he, along with Mertz, helped design a new type of harness for the dogs and intended to complete an appendix about "details of this and our other harnesses and dog matters." Ninnis, however, would never manage to complete his appendix before his untimely death months later. Ninnis, in his final diary entry on 9 November 1912, stated that:

"We and the Southern Party leave to-morrow. I must close my writing for now, maybe for two months, maybe for good and all, for who know[s] what may happen during the next two months....I hope we shall pull through all right, and join up with the 'Terra Nova' farthest; and now I will stop."

Ninnis would eventually be selected to be a part of the three-man sledging team, the Far Eastern Party, together with Mawson and Mertz. The party left Cape Denison on 10 November 1912 to survey George V Land. After three weeks of excellent progress the party was crossing the Ninnis Glacier, when Ninnis fell through a snow-covered crevasse. Mertz had skied over the crevasse lid, Mawson had been on his sled with his weight dispersed but Ninnis was jogging beside the second sled and his body weight is likely to have breached the lid. Six dogs, most of the party's rations, their tent and other essential supplies disappeared into a massive crevasse 480 km east of the main base. Mertz and Mawson spotted one dead and one injured dog on a ledge 46 metres (151 ft) down but Ninnis was not seen again. After calling Ninnis' name for three hours at the edge of the crevasse, Mawson and Mertz held a short memorial service for Ninnis. Mawson, and in particular Mertz, were devastated at the loss. Mertz would write in his sledging diary:

"We could do nothing, really nothing. We were standing, helplessly, next to a friend's grave, my best friend of the whole expedition. We read a prayer in Mawson's prayer book. This was our only consolation, the last honouring we could do for our beloved friend Ninnis. Our only comfort was the thought that the death was a straight path from a happy life. The ways of God are often difficult to explain."

Without the extra food and supplies for the remaining men and dogs, the situation proved dire for both Mawson and Mertz. They had no choice but to retrace their journey back to Cape Denison. Mawson remarked in his diary: "9 hours after the accident, started back but terribly handicapped... May God help us."

== Legacy ==
The lives of Ninnis, together with Mertz, are commemorated with two memorials. The first memorial is a wooden cross erected at Cape Denison by members of the Australasian Anatarctic Expedition as a tribute to both Ninnis and Mertz. The second memorial, unveiled in 2021, is located in Hobart, Tasmania. The memorial has been jointly funded by the UK government, the Swiss government and the Mawson's Huts Foundation. The members of the Australasian Antarctic Expedition spent some time in Hobart en route to Antarctica via Macquarie Island.

Ninnis' sword from the army, an Edward VII 1897 infantry officer's sword, was sold at auction in 2022 for £5,600.
