= Ninnis Glacier =

Glacier in Antarctica

- Location within Antarctica
- Type: Crevassed
- Location: Australian Antarctic Territory, Antarctia
- Coordinates: 68°22′S 147°0′E
- Status: Endangered

Ninnis Glacier is a large, heavily hummocked and crevassed glacier descending steeply from the high interior to the sea in a broad valley, on George V Coast in Antarctica.

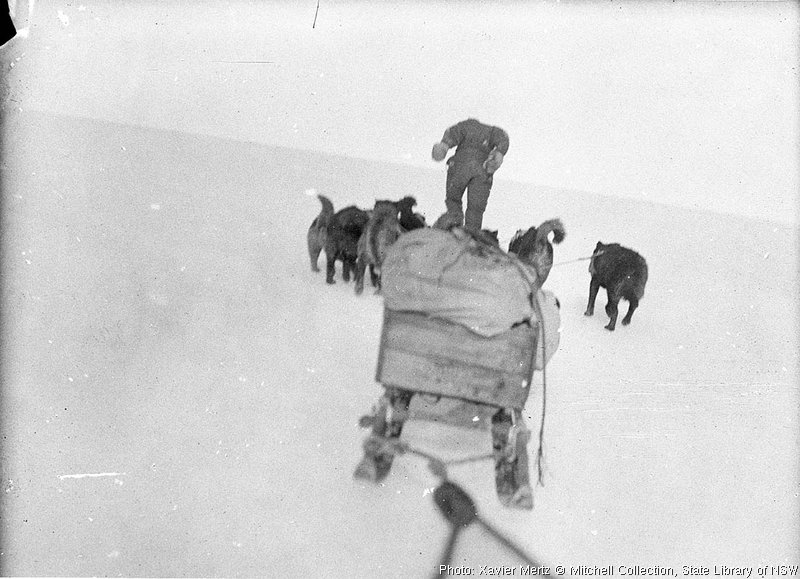
Australian expedition

It was discovered by the Australasian Antarctic Expedition (1911–14) under Douglas Mawson, who named it for Lieutenant B. E. S. Ninnis, who lost his life on the far east sledge journey of the expedition on 14 December 1912 through falling into the Black Crevasse in the glacier.

The seawards extension of the glacier is the broad Ninnis Glacier Tongue (68°5′S 147°45′E). It was recorded (1962) as projecting seaward about 30 miles (50 km).

== See also ==
- List of glaciers in the Antarctic
- List of Antarctic ice streams
