= Sledging ration =

Type of meal consumed by members of polar expeditions

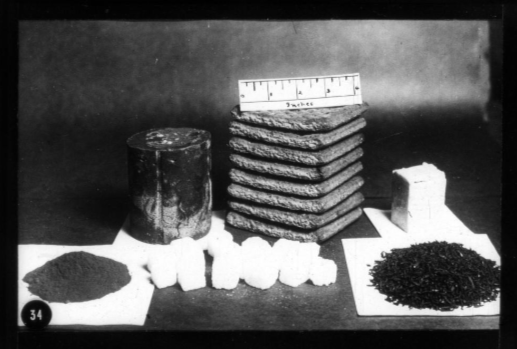
One day's sledging rations on Scott's British Antarctic Expedition (1910–1913)

Sledging rations are a type of meal consumed by members of polar expeditions. These rations are designed for the use of sledging parties travelling long distances without support vehicles. They are meant to be calorically dense and provide a balanced diet. They must optimize weight and portability, as well as nutritional benefit. Typically, sledging rations are dehydrated to cut down on weight.

== Composition ==
=== Staples ===
Sledging biscuits are an essential component of sledging rations. These hard, long-life biscuits are made of flour, salt, butter, water and baking soda. Sledging biscuits are popular on expeditions in Antarctica because they are high in energy. Plasmon biscuits were taken in large quantities by Ernest Shackleton in his Antarctic Expedition of 1902, and were also favored by Douglas Mawson. Plasmon itself was a powdered milk extract used as a fortifying agent that was utilized in early sledging rations.

Hoosh (occasionally spelled hooch) is a stew made of sledging biscuits, pemmican and water. More broadly, it may be a mix of water with dried meat, fat, and a grain-based thickening agent. It was the common food of early twentieth century Antarctic expeditions, used, for example, by the expeditions of Robert Falcon Scott (1910–1913) and Ernest Shackleton (1914–1916).

=== 20th century ===
For the Terra Nova Expedition of 1910 through 1913, daily rations for party members weighed over two pounds and provided 4,430 calories. They included pemmican, sugar, fortified biscuits, butter, cocoa and tea.

Gino Watkins developed a sledging ration in 1930 for the British Arctic Air Route Expedition. His formula (with modifications) was one of the most popular among polar winter parties until the 1950s. He recommended 5,522 calories per day for each member. Daily rations were composed mostly of pemmican, margerine, and fortified biscuits. Other major components included pea flour, Plasmon powder, Plasmon oats, sugar, cocoa, milk chocolate, and Horlicks. This was supplemented by cod liver oil, dried yeast, lime juice, and essential salts.

On the British North Greenland expedition, party members were issued rations that provided 4,164 calories per day. They included pemmican, butter, potato powder, cocoa, chocolate, sugar, rolled oats, dried milk, and biscuits. In 1959, it was determined that 4,800 calories per day is the optimum intake for sledging crews.

=== Modern rations ===
Modern sledging rations provided by the British Antarctic Survey provide each crew member with around 3,500 calories per day. Main meals are typically freeze-dried or dehydrated, and supplemented with tea, coffee, chocolate and hot chocolate powder, orange drink, biscuits, butter, sugar, and powdered milk. Herbs, spices, and condiments comprise a supplementary "goodies box".

== See also ==
- Hard tack
- MRE
