= Cape Denison =

Headland of Antarctica

Coordinates: 67°0′S 142°40′E

Location of Cape Denison
Antarctica

Cape Denison is a rocky point at the head of Commonwealth Bay in George V Land, Antarctica. It was discovered in 1912 by the Australasian Antarctic Expedition (1911–14) under Douglas Mawson, who named it for Sir Hugh Denison of Sydney, a patron of the expedition. The cape was the site of the expedition's main base. Called by Mawson "the windiest place on Earth", the site experiences fierce katabatic winds.

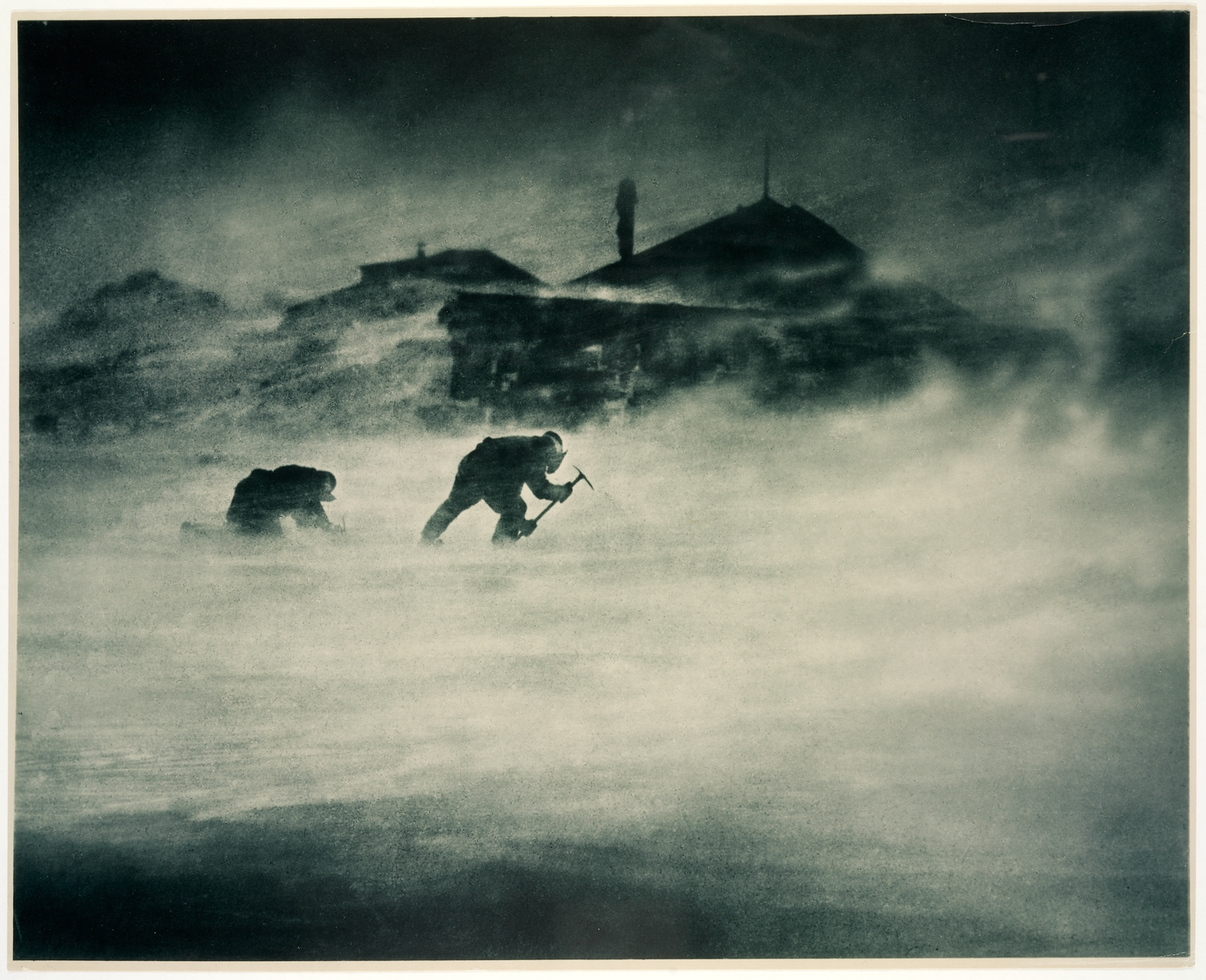
This 1912 photo by Frank Hurley shows the fierce winds.

== Historic site ==
The site, including Mawson's Huts, Boat Harbour and the historic artefacts contained within its waters, has been designated a Historic Site or Monument (HSM 77), following a proposal by Australia to the Antarctic Treaty Consultative Meeting.

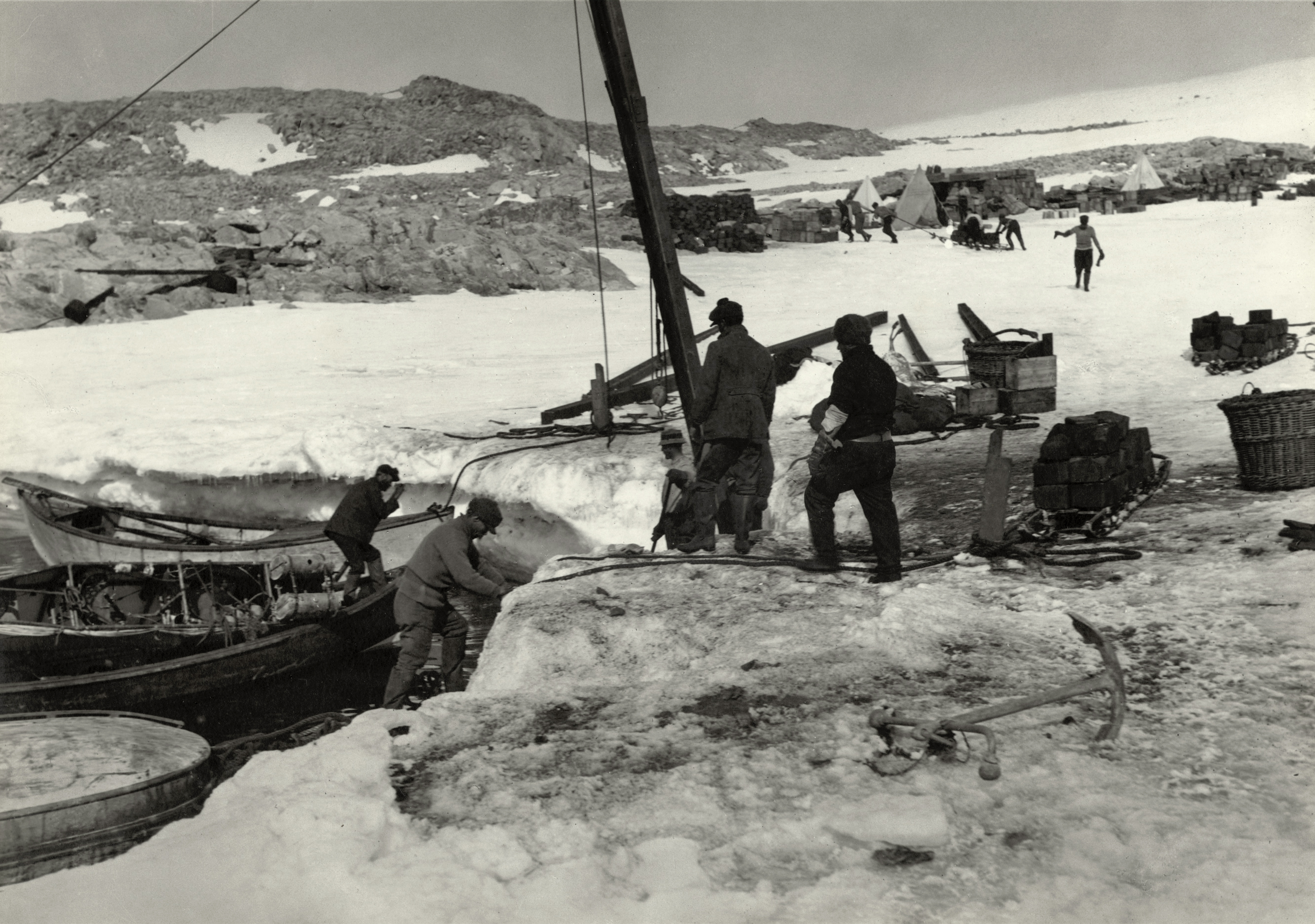
Unloading supplies at the cape.

== First aeroplane in Antarctica ==
The Air-tractor sledge, the first aeroplane to be brought to Antarctica (in 1912) was stationed at Cape Denison, although it never took to the air on the continent because it was damaged before being shipped there. The aircraft, a Vickers R.E.P. Type Monoplane (the first aircraft type to be built by Vickers) was used briefly as a "propeller driven snow tractor" and then abandoned, as the pistons seized up due to the cold.

=== Relic found on 1 January 2010 ===
On New Year's Day, 2010, the carpenter of the latest expedition to Cape Denison came across small (150mm) pieces of the fuselage tubing in the harbour at a very low tide (January 2010 was a month with a 'blue moon'). The pieces found were cut from the final section of the airframe and constituted the fittings for a rudder. An attempt had been made by Mawson's team to fabricate a metal ice rudder. This device replaced the original rudder (which did not work at the low speeds attained by the air tractor). The original rudder is preserved in Mawson's Hut at Cape Denison, while the ice rudder is in the Antarctic Division at Hobart, Tasmania.

The remains of the fuselage are probably still buried under the ice near Mawson's Huts. The ice is 3m deep and the remains are about 30m from the edge of the harbour. An attempt was to be made in December 2010 to excavate the site – a similar excavation in 2008 nearby did not find any remains, but since then more sophisticated equipment (magnetometer, ground penetrating radar, metal detector, differential GPS, ice drilling) has been used and a more precise position found. However, this work has been delayed, in 2010-11 by logistical constraints, and in 2011-12 and 2012-13 by the presence of giant iceberg B9B which has locked in fast ice and prevented the French Antarctic supply vessel L'Astrolabe from entering Commonwealth Bay.

== Adélie penguin colony ==
Cape Denison once supported a large colony of Adélie penguins with perhaps 150,000 members. In 2010, a large iceberg trapped the colony, making access to the sea difficult and threatening the lives of all the penguins. By 2013, only 10,000 remained and by 2016, they were reported in danger of being "wiped out". Media reports were exaggerated however and in response, the authors released this update:

It is important to recognise that this study focuses on the Adélie penguin colonies at Cape Denison and the MacKellar Islets, which has been well known, and importantly, well studied over the past century. The study reported here identified that the impact of the iceberg B09B on the penguins since 2010. The number of penguins breeding at these colonies has declined markedly since estimates were first made 100 years ago. However our study concerns only the impact B09B and the associated fast ice that has built up between it and the land since the iceberg stranded in 2010. The penguins now have to commute about 65 km between colonies where they breed and the sea where they can feed. Many fewer penguins are now returning to the colonies to attempt to breed and of those that do return most fail to rear their chicks. We found hundreds of abandoned eggs and thousands of dead chicks. We did not suggest that thousands of adult penguins have died as some media reports suggest. In fact it is unlikely many if any adult penguins have died as a result of this stranding event. We found very few, perhaps no pre-breeding birds at Cape Denison and, if as we predict, few if any young birds prospecting for a place to breed in future are visiting these colonies the local colonies could become extinct within the breeding life of an Adelie penguins (<16 years) if young birds do not replace the old established breeders as they come to the end of their lives." "This iceberg stranding event only affects Adelie penguins in the Commonwealth Bay area, the millions of Adelie penguins breeding around the rest of Antarctica are not affected."

The 102 ha colony site has been designated an Important Bird Area (IBA) by BirdLife International.
