= List of members of the Australasian Antarctic expedition =

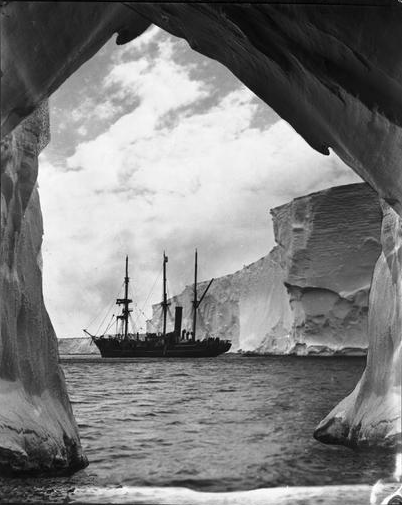
Aurora, moored in Commonwealth Bay

The Australasian Antarctic Expedition, under the leadership of Douglas Mawson, left Hobart, Tasmania, on 2 December 1911 in SY Aurora. Members of the expedition were organised into three parties, two in bases established on the Antarctic mainland and the third on the sub-Antarctic Macquarie Island. The Main Party base, under Mawson, was established at Cape Denison in Commonwealth Bay, at 67°0'S, 142°40'E. A Far Western party, under Frank Wild, was based on the Shackleton Ice Shelf, at 66°0'S, 100°E. The Macquarie Island base under George Ainsworth, as well as carrying out meteorological and other observations, acted as a wireless relay station connecting the Antarctic to Hobart.

Aurora, the expedition's ship, conducted a series of oceanographic surveys as part of the expedition and was captained by John King Davis, who also acted as the expedition's second-in-command.

== Land parties ==
=== Main Base ===
Name	Age	Image	Role	Notes
Edward Frederick Robert (Bob) Bage	23	Robert Bage	Astronomer, assistant magnetician, recorder of tides.	Member of party that remained for second winter, 1913 Bage served with the Royal Australian Engineers in the First World War, and died at Gallipoli on 7 May 1915.
Francis Howard Bickerton	22	Frank Bickerton	Engineer, and motor expert, in charge of air-tractor sledge	Member of party that remained for second winter, 1913 Bickerton was selected for Sir Ernest Shackleton's Imperial Trans-Antarctic Expedition as motor engineer, but on the outbreak of war in August 1914 he joined the British army, serving in the Royal Flying Corps.
John Close	40	John Close	General duties; assistant collector, member of several sledging parties	
Percy Correll	19	Percy Correll	Mechanic, assistant physicist. Member of Eastern coastal sledging party	Acted as photographer on Aurora's final cruise, 1913–14
Walter Henry Hannam	26	Walter Hannam	Wireless telegraphist, assistant magnetician	Left base February 1913, replaced by Sidney Jeffryes
Alfred Hodgeman	26	Alfred Hodgeman	Cartographer, sketch artist, assistant meteorologist	Member of party that remained for second winter, 1913
John George Hunter	23	John Hunter	Biologist	Acted as biologist on Aurora's final cruise, 1913–14
John Francis (Frank) Hurley	24	Frank Hurley	Official photographer and cinephotographer	Hurley was the official photographer accompanying Sir Ernest Shackleton's Imperial Trans-Antarctic Expedition, 1914–16, and returned to Antarctica in 1930 with the British Australian and New Zealand Antarctic Research Expedition (BANZARE).
Sidney Jeffryes	27	Sidney Jeffryes	Wireless operator, replacement for Walter Hannam	Joined base February 1913. Suffered mental breakdown; after the expedition he was confined to an asylum in Ararat, Victoria. Died 1942.
Charles Francis Laseron	25	Charles Laseron	Taxidermist, biological collector. Participated in several sledging journeys	
Cecil Thomas Madigan	22	Cecil Madigan	Meteorologist, in charge of dogs during second season	Member of party that remained for second winter, 1913
Douglas Mawson	30	Douglas Mawson	Geologist, expedition leader	Only survivor of party of three sledging to east of base, 1912–13, Ninnis and Mertz having died. Mawson returned to the Antarctic in 1929 and 1931 as leader of BANZARE.
Archibald Lang McLean	26	Archibald McLean	Chief medical officer, bacteriologist	Member of party that remained for second winter, 1913. Editor of "Adelie Blizzard" (expedition publication) during second season
Xavier Mertz	28	Xavier Mertz	With Ninnis, in charge of Greenland dogs	Died 7 January 1913 during sledging journey
Herbert Dyce Murphy	32	Herbert Murphy	In charge of expedition stores	Had been designated leader of a third Antarctic base that was not established.
Belgrave Edward Sutton Ninnis	23	B. E. S. Ninnis	With Mertz, in charge of Greenland dogs	Died 14 December 1912, falling into a crevasse during sledging journey
Frank Leslie Stillwell	23	Frank Stillwell	Geologist	
Eric Webb	22	Eric Webb	Chief magnetician	Webb was the last survivor of the expedition, dying on 23 January 1984, aged 94.
Leslie Hatton Whetter	29	Leslie Whetter	Surgeon	

=== Western Base ===
Name	Age	Image	Role	Notes
Charles Dovers	21	Charles Dovers	Cartographer	Member of western sledging journey that reached Gaussberg.
Charles Harrisson	43	Charles Harrisson	Biologist and Artist	Accompanied Wild on eastern sledging journey.
Charles Hoadley	24	Charles Hoadley	Geologist	Member of western sledging journey that reached Gaussberg.
Sydney Evan Jones	24	Sydney Jones	Medical officer	Member of western sledging journey that reached Gaussberg.
Alexander Lorimer Kennedy	22	Alexander Kennedy	Magnetician and assistant cartographer	Accompanied Wild on eastern sledging journey.
Morton Henry Moyes	25	Morton Moyes	Meteorologist	Remained at base during the main sledging journeys. In 1916, Moyes acted as navigator on Aurora during the rescue of the marooned Ross Sea party at the end of Shackleton's Imperial Trans-Antarctic Expedition. Moyes also participated in BANZARE in 1929–30.
Andrew Douglas Watson	24	Andrew Watson	Geologist	Accompanied Wild on eastern sledging journey.
John Robert Francis (Frank) Wild	38	Frank Wild	Leader of Western party.	Veteran of the Discovery Expedition, 1901–04, and the Nimrod Expedition, 1907–09, Wild was a member of Shackleton's Imperial Trans-Antarctic Expedition, 1914–16 and led the Elephant Island group. He was second-in-command of Shackleton's final expedition in the Quest, 1921–22, and acted as its leader after Shackleton's death in January 1922.

=== Macquarie Island ===
Name	Age	Image	Role	Notes
George Ainsworth	30		Leader, meteorologist	Visited Antarctica during the final cruise of the Aurora, 1913–14.
Leslie Blake	21		Cartographer and geologist	Visited Antarctica during the final cruise of the Aurora, 1913–14. Died on 3 October 1918 while on active service with the Australian Field Artillery in France.
Harold Hamilton	26		Biologist	Visited Antarctica during the final cruise of the Aurora, 1913–14. Has the fish Scopelosaurus hamiltoni (Waite 1916) named after him.
Charles Sandell	25		Wireless operator and mechanic	Visited Antarctica during the final cruise of the Aurora, 1913–14.
Arthur Sawyer	26		Wireless operator	Left expedition in August 1913 due to illness.

== Aurora ==
=== Officers ===
Name	Age	Image	Role	Notes
John Hamilton Blair	24		Chief officer, final Antarctic voyage	
John King Davis	28		Master of Aurora and second-in-command of the expedition	Davis had been chief officer, and later captain, of Nimrod during Shackleton's 1907–09 expedition. In 1916 he captained Aurora again, during the Ross Sea party rescue mission. In 1929–30 he captained Discovery during the first BANZARE year.
Frank D. Fletcher			Chief officer, second and third Aurora voyages, replacing Toutcher.	
F. J. Gillies	35		Chief engineer	In 1916 Gillies served as chief engineer of Aurora during the Ross Sea party rescue mission.
Percival Gray	22		Second and navigating officer	
Clarence Petersen de la Motte	19		Third officer	In 1916, served as Aurora's first officer during the Ross Sea party rescue mission.
Norman Toutcher			Chief officer, first Antarctic voyage, succeeded by Fletcher.	

=== Crew ===
More than 90 persons are listed by the Australian government's Antarctic Division as serving on Aurora during the duration of the expedition, including the crew that brought the ship from London to Australia in 1911. In general, the crews changed for each of the Antarctic cruises, but a few served on more than one cruise.

=== Others ===
Mawson names several others who took part in one or more of the Aurora cruises, but were not members of the landing parties: Captain James Davis, a whaling authority; C.C. Eitel, the expedition's secretary; T.T. Flynn, biologist; E.R. Waite, biologist; J. van Waterschoot, marine artist.
