= Norman Toutcher =

Norman Champion Toutcher (1884–1924) was a sailor, mainly known for his time as chief officer of the SY Aurora during the 1911–1914 Australasian Antarctic expedition, under Captain John King Davis.

Toutcher joined the expedition in Cardiff, and sailed to Australia, where the expedition proper started. He accompanied the Aurora on its first Antarctic voyage—south from Hobart to Macquarie Island, on to the Antarctic mainland to drop off the land parties, and back to Australia.

However, Davis thought Toutcher a "hopeless fool", and he was replaced by Frank D. Fletcher on 12 March 1912, when the Aurora arrived back in Hobart.

Cape Toutcher, on the west coast of Macquarie Island, is named after him.
