= Fletcher Island =

Island in Antarctica

- Location within Antarctica

Geography
- Location: Antarctica
- Coordinates: 66°53′S 143°05′E

Administration
- Administered under the Antarctic Treaty System

Demographics
- Population: Uninhabited

Fletcher Island is a rocky island, 0.5 km (0.25 nmi) in diameter, which is the largest of the Fletcher Islands. Fletcher Island is located at 66°53′S 143°05′E. Fletcher Island lies in the eastern part of Commonwealth Bay, 11 km (6 nmi) west-southwest (WSW) of Cape Gray. Fletcher Island was discovered by the Australian Antarctic Expedition (AAE) (1911–1914) under Douglas Mawson, who named it for Frank D. Fletcher, First Officer on the expedition ship Aurora.

== See also ==
- Composite Antarctic Gazetteer
- Fletcher Islands
- List of Antarctic and sub-Antarctic islands
- List of Antarctic islands south of 60° S
- SCAR
- Territorial claims in Antarctica
