= F. J. Gillies =

British explorer

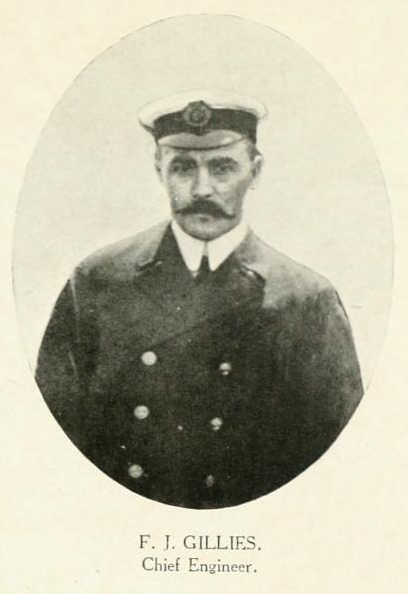
Gillies around 1911–1914

Frederick Jacob Gillies (c. 1874 – 2 June 1941) was a Welsh mariner and engineer. During his early career he trained as an engineer aboard Welsh steamships, before working the India trade routes.

From 1911 to 1914, during the Australasian Antarctic expedition, he served as chief engineer aboard the SY Aurora, under John King Davis.

In his 1962 book, High Latitude, Davis wrote of Gillies' work during the expedition: "We were most fortunate in the selection of F. J. Gillies as chief engineer of the Aurora. Quite apart from his high technical skill and efficiency as an engineer, he was the wise counsellor and kindly shipmate of everyone on board throughout the expedition." Gillies joined the Aurora again in 1916, and served as first officer during the rescue of the Ross Sea party of the Imperial Trans-Antarctic Expedition, for which he was later awarded the Polar Medal.

The Gillies Islands, in the Shackleton Ice Shelf in Antarctica, were named after him by Sir Douglas Mawson.
