= Frank D. Fletcher =

Australian sailor

Frederick "Frank" Douglas Fletcher (1889 – 20 August 1936) was an Australian sailor, mainly known for his time as chief officer of the SY Aurora during the 1911–1914 Australasian Antarctic expedition, under Captain John King Davis.

Fletcher replaced N. C. Toutcher—who had been chief officer during Aurora's first voyage of the expedition—for the second Antarctic voyage, and the spring and winter sub-Antarctic voyages of 1912 and 1913.

In his 1962 book High Latitude, Davis described Fletcher as "a most efficient and conscientious officer and seaman who at first sight might have been taken for the prototype of the perfect 'Bucko', that semi-legendary figure sometimes described as having 'a jaw like a sea boot'." Fletcher left the Aurora in 1913 to join a coastal shipping company, presumably in New Zealand, where he was discharged.

Expedition commander Douglas Mawson named Fletcher Island—near Commonwealth Bay—after him.

During WWI, Fletcher served as third officer on the Australian hospital ship, HMAS Grantala and then on the Wandilla. He subsequently worked for the Adelaide Steamship Company, including two years in Denmark where he oversaw the building of freighters.

Fletcher returned to Antarctic in 1929 as captain of the Junee, sent to search for the Danish ship, København.

He died at home at Bondi on 20 August 1936, aged 47 years.
