= SS Kyarra =

Cargo and passenger luxury liner torpedoed and sunk near Swanage

Coordinates: 50°34′54″N 1°56′34″W

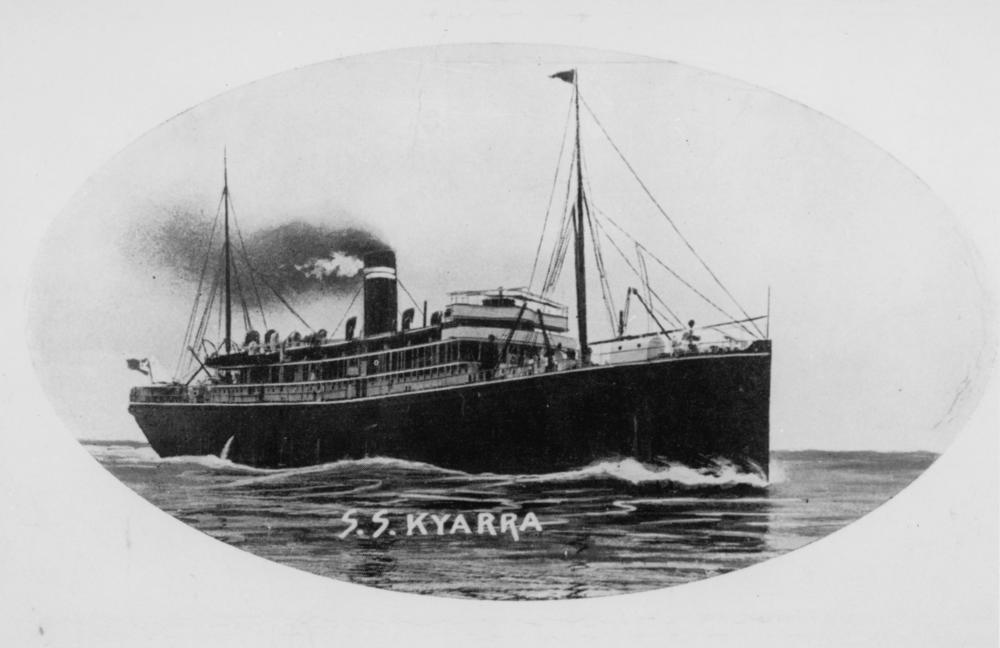

History

Australia
- Name: Kyarra
- Owner: Australian United Steam Navigation Co. Ltd.
- Port of registry: Fremantle, Western Australia
- Builder: William Denny and Brothers, Dumbarton
- Launched: 2 February 1903
- Fate: Sunk on 26 May 1918

General characteristics
- Tonnage: 6,953 GRT; 4,383 NRT
- Length: 415 ft 5 in (126.62 m)
- Beam: 52 ft 2 in (15.90 m)
- Draught: 31 ft 5 in (9.58 m)
- Propulsion: 2 × 375 hp (280 kW) triple expansion engines
- Speed: 15.4 knots (28.5 km/h; 17.7 mph)
- Capacity: 2,600 tons general cargo; 286 passengers (126 first class & 160 second class)
- Armament: 4.7 in (120 mm) gun

Kyarra was a 6,953-ton (7,065 t) steel cargo and passenger luxury liner, built in Scotland in 1903 for the Australian United Steam Navigation Company.

== Construction and launch ==
The Kyarra was built at Dumbarton by William Denny and Brothers, and launched on 2 February 1903 on the River Clyde, Scotland. Her name was taken from the aboriginal word for a small fillet of possum fur.

== Career ==
For ten years Kyarra sailed between Fremantle, Western Australia, where she was registered, and Sydney, New South Wales carrying cargo and passengers. She sailed under the flag of the United Steam Navigation Company Limited of London.

On 6 November 1914 she was requisitioned in Brisbane and converted into a hospital ship (HMAT A.55 Kyarra) for the purpose of transporting the Australian medical units to Egypt. The hull was painted white with a large red cross on the side. She carried the full staff and equipment of the Nos. 1 and 2 General Hospitals, the Nos. 1 and 2 Stationary Hospitals, and the No. 1 Clearing Hospital.

In March 1915, Kyarra was converted into a troop transport. Commonwealth control ended 4 January 1918.

== Wireless telegraphy ==
In October 1911, the then wireless operator, Sidney Jeffryes achieved brief fame for the ship which was reported in the Sydney Sun: "Record by the Kyarra. Mr. S. H. Jeffryes, wireless operator on the A.U.S.N. Co.'s Kyarra, which was fitted up by the Australasian Wireless Co., Ltd., has put up a record for overland wireless messages between ships. His report says:— "Coming into Adelaide on the 18th Instant, distant from Adelaide 140 miles (230 km), I picked up the Cooma. This exceeds the records of that of the Cooma and Riverlna four months ago from Townsville to the Bight by a small margin of about 40 miles (64 km). The conditions were absolutely normal on the night, a fact which could hardly be said of the occasion four months ago, which was a night on which every operator got good distances, myself and the Levuka getting 2,100 miles (3,400 km). It is claimed by the Cooma and Riverina that the distance was 2,300 miles (3,700 km). This is not so, as direct it is not more than 1,500 miles (2,400 km), but even this is equivalent to almost twice as much by sea. I thus claim to have established an Australasian record for transmission and reception over land, beating the previous one by 40 miles (64 km)." Jeffryes was later appointed wireless operator for the Australian Antarctic Expedition.

== Sinking ==
On 5 May 1918, Kyarra was sailing from Tilbury to Devonport to embark civilian passengers and take on full general cargo. However she was sunk by the German submarine UB-57 near Swanage with the loss of six lives on 26 May 1918.

The captain of UB-57, Oberleutnant Johannes Lohs, died at sea, aged 29. Lohs sailed from Zeebrugge on 3 August 1918. The last contact he made with base was on the evening of 14 August 1918. At the time UB-57 was homeward bound. She was believed to be in the area of the Sandiette Bank, east of the Straits of Dover. It is thought UB-57 hit a mine. Lohs' body subsequently washed ashore was buried in the Ysselsteyn German war cemetery, Netherlands.

SS Kyarra was discovered in the late 1960s by a member of the Kingston and Elmbridge British Sub-Aqua Club, which later bought the wreck. The wreck, which lies one mile (1.6 km) off Anvil Point, remains popular with divers.

In honour of this vessel, a house was named in Ipswich, Queensland, built in 1920.
