= Sidney Jeffryes =

Australian wireless telegraphy operator

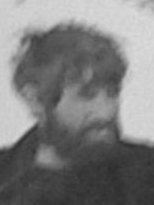
Jeffryes during the Australasian Antarctic Expedition

Sidney Harry Jeffryes (20 July 1884 – 16 October 1942) was an early Australian wireless telegraphy operator. Trained by Australasian Wireless, he was initially employed on coastal shipping and established at least one record for distance transmission. But he is best known for his service as the wireless officer at Cape Denison during the second year of the Australasian Antarctic Expedition, from February 1913 to December 1913, under the command of explorer Douglas Mawson. Jeffryes' service ended in September 1913, two months prior to the relief of the shore party, after he developed symptoms of paranoia and had to be relieved of his duties.

== Early life and family ==
Jeffryes was born in Toowoomba, Queensland in 1884, second son of Henry Jeffryes and Helena (sometimes Ellen) Jeffryes (née White). His father was a postmaster and telegraphist with the Queensland Post and Telegraph Department and, following federation, with the Australian Postmaster-General's Department. Sidney's given name is indexed as "Sydney" in the Queensland register of births, deaths and marriages, but that might be a transcription error. Sidney's father, Henry, was a child of Henry Jeffryes and Sarah Jeffryes (née Bland). After a long career with the Post Office, Sidney's father died in 1910. His mother, Helena, was born in Essex in the UK c. 1853 and her father was William White. She died in 1932. There were at least seven children of the marriage:

- Louisa Ellen. Married Thomas Maxwell Gibb in 1898.
- Ivy Llalah (likely Lalla), born 1875. Married Walter Henry Donely in 1894.
- Ida Dorothea Maud, born 1879. Married Robert George Denny in 1904.
- Hulbert Trevannion, born 1881, died 1946. Teacher Gundiah (1910s). Married Isabel Jeffryes née King (died 1946) in 1906.
- Norma Fanny, born 1882.
- Sidney (alt Sydney) Harry, born 1884.
- Francis ("Frank') Edwin, born 1886. Died young in 1902 at Allora.
- Constance ("Connie") Eva, born 1888. Died 1949. Achieved unwanted prominence in an inheritance dispute.

The family grew up in Allora, Queensland. Sidney's father, Henry, spent almost 20 years in the district from 1889. Initially, he was assistant in charge of the local post office but, in September 1899, was appointed officer-in-charge. The death, due to pneumonia, of Sidney's younger brother Frank, in July 1902, was a major tragedy for the family. A marble mural tablet to Frank's life was unveiled at the Allora State School in December 1902. Sidney's father was transferred to the Emerald Post Office in April 1909, after nearly 20 years at Allora. The community held a public farewell for Henry at the Allora Town Hall and he was presented with a purse of sovereigns. By the time of the transfer to Emerald, Henry's family were mostly grown and his own health was failing. Only his wife relocated with him and, when he died in 1910, there was little connection with Emerald. She relocated to the larger provincial centre of Toowoomba, where she died in 1932.

Telegraphy was a major part of the activities of any rural post office and there can be no doubt that Sidney learned Morse code and telegraphy with his father. After federation, the Postmaster-General's Department discouraged any staff experimenting with wireless. However, from 1897, news of Marconi's succession of wireless telegraphy achievements, spanning greater and greater distances, filled the newspapers of the day. At that time, many private experimenters were operating without licences and, in a remote location such as Allora, the temptations to experiment would have been strong.

== Telegraphist ==
The Commonwealth of Australia Gazette records Jeffryes as being employed on a temporary basis as a Telegraphist at Sydney from 26 March 1909, for a period of three months. The appointment was renewed again June 1909, September 1909, and finally December 1909. However, mere telegraphy did not offer the excitement or pecuniary rewards of a wireless operator of the day and his career progressed.

=== Wireless training ===
In the late 19th century, the fitting of wireless equipment to the great steamships carrying mail between Great Britain and Australia was becoming commonplace and, following Australia's belated establishment of a network of coastal stations from 1910, many of the larger coastal vessels around Australia were also fitted out. Australasian Wireless won the contracts with the Australian Government to establish a network of coastal wireless stations around Australia, using Telefunken transmitters and receivers. That gave the firm a strong marketing edge in the supply of equipment to local shipping to utilise the coastal station network. Frequently, the sale package also included provision of skilled personnel to operate and maintain the equipment. While the Marconi Telefunken College of Telegraphy had not yet been established as a formal training facility, the company did undertake internal training of potential operators. Jeffryes is reported as having qualified as a wireless operator with Australasian Wireless Co. Ltd.

=== Coastal shipping ===
In October 1911, Jeffryes had a small taste of fame. It was reported in the Sydney Sun that: "Record by the Kyarra. Mr. S. H. Jeffryes, wireless operator on the A.U.S.N. Co.'s Kyarra, which was fitted up by the Australasian Wireless Co., Ltd., has put up a record for overland wireless messages between ships. His report says:— "Coming into Adelaide on the 18th Instant, distant from Adelaide 140 miles, I picked up the Cooma. This exceeds the records of that of the Cooma and Riverlna four months ago from Townsville to the Bight by a small margin of about 40 miles. The conditions were absolutely normal on the night, a fact which could hardly be said of the occasion four months ago, which was a night on which every operator got good distances, myself and the Levuka getting 2100 miles. It is claimed by the Cooma and Riverina that the distance was 2300 miles. This is not so, as direct it is not more than 1500 miles, but even this is equivalent to almost twice as much by sea. I thus claim to have established an Australasian record for transmission and reception over land, beating the previous one by 40 miles."

It was common in that era for wireless officers to move frequently between ships. At the time of Jeffryes' appointment to the Australasian Antarctic Expedition, he was reported as having been most recently on the SS Westralia.

== Antarctica ==
=== Preparations ===
The Australasian Antarctic Expedition (AAE) was the first such endeavour in history, and the only one during the Heroic Age of Antarctic Exploration to maintain radio contact with its country of origin. Only a high-powered facility of comparable capacity to those recently established at Sydney (VIS) and Perth (VIP) would have been capable of direct communication between Hobart and Cape Denison in Antarctica, and that would have been prohibitively expensive and resource hungry. It was decided to establish an intermediate station at Macquarie Island and, by halving the maximum distance for each signal to traverse, it was expected that the 2 kW Telefunken transmitters of the Australasian Wireless Co. Ltd. would enable reliable communication.

Jeffryes had a keen interest in both Antarctica and wireless telegraphy and, when the first call for applications to join the AAE was made, he sought an appointment as wireless operator. But at that time, his length of experience as a telegraphist and wireless telegraphist was not great and he was not successful. Douglas Mawson appointed Walter Henry Hannam, who was associated with the prominent aviation pioneer and inventor, George Augustine Taylor, and had himself been involved with the establishment of the Wireless Institute of Australia.

A series of tragedies and mishaps had led to the Cape Denison shore base on Antarctica being kept open for a second winter, from March to December 1913. But there had been some tension between Mawson and Hannam and, in January 1913, Hannam elected to return home after his year at Macquarie Island and Cape Denison. The intermediate station that he set up at Wireless Hill on Macquarie Island was fully functional and providing sterling service, exchanging messages with the Hobart coastal station VIH. But there had been ongoing problems with both transmission and reception at Cape Denison, and only occasional messages were got out. That failure prevented the expedition from fulfilling the terms of its contract with Australian and London press in providing timely updates on the activities and status of the expedition. The replacement wireless officer would bring with him improved wireless telegraphy receivers (sensitivity of the crucial detectors was taking great strides at the time) which it was expected would make the Cape Denison station fully effective.

An appeal was made for a wireless operator to serve during the second winter of the AAE, and Jeffryes was given the appointment.

=== Cape Denison ===
Jeffryes arrived at the Cape Denison shore base in February 1913, just as the base was enduring a near-nightmare situation. The expedition leader and commander, Douglas Mawson, stumbled into the base, the sole survivor of a sled dog probe eastward along the previously unknown interior coastline of the Australian Antarctic Territory. As the new wireless operator, Jeffryes was able to start the relay of communications that would inform Australia of the expedition leader's survival. However, within days of Mawson's arrival, the Antarctic winter began.

Mawson's expedition hut was located close to what was then the site of the South Magnetic Pole, and the continual radio interference and static associated with polar conditions threatened the base's minimal ability to contact Macquarie Island. The expedition leader at first admired Jeffryes' assiduousness with earphones and the Morse code key, but grew increasingly guarded in his praise. In Mawson's words, Jeffryes "applied himself to work with enthusiasm and perhaps an over-conscientious spirit." Climatic conditions outside the hut made outdoor exercise in winter impossible, leading to cabin fever. All the expeditioners would have been familiar with tales of Antarctic winter madness and, particularly, the problems of the Belgian Antarctic Expedition. Conditions at Cape Denison were clearly worse than those on the Belgica, due to the katabatic winds which, because of the unique geography, are at their upper extreme in the vicinity.

In July 1913, as Antarctica neared midwinter, wireless operator Jeffryes began to exhibit symptoms of paranoia to his fellow shore-party winter explorers, none of whom knew how to receive or transmit messages in Morse code. Expedition leader Mawson began to encourage another expedition member, airman Frank Bickerton, to learn Morse code as quickly as possible. Jeffryes's condition waxed and waned. For some weeks his comrades believed he was recovering but, in September of the same year, the radioman experienced a psychotic break and began transmitting a message, through Macquarie Island, to Australia, declaring himself to be the only sane man on the expedition. Jeffryes accused all of his comrades of having joined a criminal conspiracy to murder him. Thereupon, Mawson relieved Jeffryes of his duties.

== Return and later life ==
=== Involuntary confinement ===
In December 1913, the expedition's vessel, Aurora, relieved the troubled Antarctic shore party. Jeffryes was excluded from the welcoming celebrations in Adelaide due to his medical status, and was paid off two days after arrival at Adelaide. Mawson stated subsequently that he believed that Jeffryes had returned to full health: "Later on Jeffreys improved, and on the arrival of the ship he became quite normal, and in that condition he was landed at Adelaide we believing that he would never again have any further trouble of the kind. On the return voyage Dr. Maclean occupied the same cabin with him, and kept him closely under observation. Dr. Maclean reported to me that Jeffreys was quite well and no thought ever entered our mind that he would not travel straight home without risk. In fact his condition was so good that I decided not to make any mention of the matter to his people."

In March 1914, it was realised that Jeffryes had not returned to the family home in Toowoomba and was missing. He was found near Stawell six days later, exhausted and starved, having lived on roots and grubs, and drinking water from stagnant pools. He was arrested, clearly in a psychotic state, and was presented at the Stawell Court. His poignant plea from the dock was: "Let me go back and die, where I have hidden my trunk, in the silence of the ranges." The Court committed Jeffryes to the Ararat Lunatic Asylum, where his mental condition was diagnosed as paranoid schizophrenia. Letters from the institution, written to Mawson in 1915, testify to his challenges. Little is known of Jeffryes' later life, and he died in confinement in 1942 from a cerebral haemorrhage. A plaque has been erected in the Ararat General Cemetery near where he was buried.

=== Legacy and honors ===
Jeffryes' meticulous records of wireless reception quality during the second year of the Australasian Antarctic Expedition were correlated by himself, and by other expeditioners, with other observations of variables such as magnetic readings, auroral intensity, and St Elmo's fire. They identified, perhaps for the first time, the impact of Antarctic conditions on low-frequency radio wave propagation.

In his published histories, the expedition head and designated spokesman, Douglas Mawson, had little to say about Jeffryes' active service in Antarctica. For almost 100 years, the name of the unfortunate wireless operator was suppressed from most Antarctic records. But, in August 2010, the Australian Antarctic Division honoured Jeffryes for his pioneering winter service by naming a previously unnamed glacier after him. The Jeffryes Glacier is located in the Australian Antarctic Territory, at 67°4' south, 143°59' east. It should not be confused with the Jeffries Glacier.

In December 2013, the first opera to be based on Mawson's 1911–14 expedition to Antarctica, The Call of Aurora, by Tasmanian composer Joe Bugden, was performed at The Peacock Theatre in Hobart. A chamber opera, the work investigates the relationship between Mawson and Jeffryes.
