= Hannam Islands =

Island group in Antarctica

- Location within Antarctica

Geography
- Location: Antarctica
- Coordinates: 66°55′S 142°58′E

Administration
- Administered under the Antarctic Treaty System

Demographics
- Population: Uninhabited

The Hannam Islands are three small islands lying in the eastern part of Commonwealth Bay, Antarctica, midway between Cape Denison and Cape Gray. They were discovered by the Australasian Antarctic Expedition (1911–14) under Douglas Mawson, who named them for Walter H. Hannam, a wireless telegrapher with the expedition.

== See also ==
- List of Antarctic and sub-Antarctic islands
