= Fletcher Islands =

Island group in Antarctica

- Location within Antarctica

Geography
- Location: Antarctica
- Coordinates: 66°53′S 143°05′E

Administration
- Administered under the Antarctic Treaty System

Demographics
- Population: Uninhabited

The Fletcher Islands are a small group of islands lying 11 km (6 nmi) west-southwest (WSW) of Cape Gray in the eastern part of Commonwealth Bay. The Fletcher Islands were discovered by the Australian Antarctic Expedition (AAE) (1911–1914) under Douglas Mawson, who gave the name Fletcher to Fletcher Island, the large island of the group. The United States Advisory Committee on Antarctic Names (US-ACAN) recommends that the name Fletcher also be applied for the group in keeping with the interpretation shown on Gardner Dean Blodgett's 1955 map compiled from air photos taken by U.S. Navy (USN) Operation Highjump (1946–1947).

== See also ==
- Composite Antarctic Gazetteer
- Fletcher Island
- List of Antarctic and sub-Antarctic islands
- List of Antarctic islands south of 60° S
- SCAR
- Territorial claims in Antarctica
