= Walter Henry Hannam =

Australian wireless operator

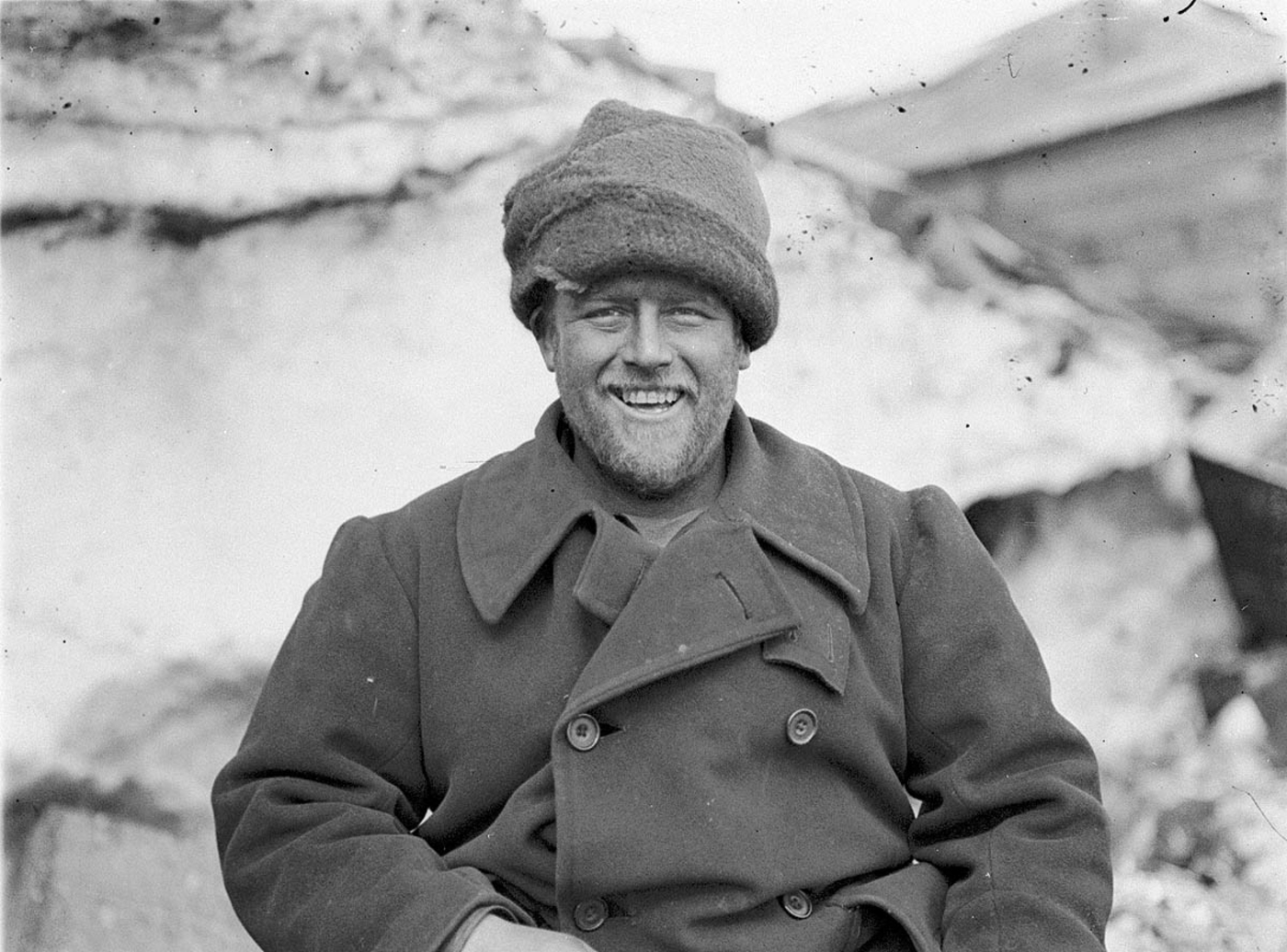
Hannam during the Australasian Antarctic expedition

Walter Henry Hannam (1885–1965) was an Australian wireless experimenter, a founding member of the Wireless Institute of Australia, wireless operator and mechanic on the Australasian Antarctic Expedition, a member of the ANZAC Wireless Company in World War I, and tireless promoter of amateur radio in the 1920s.

== Early life and family ==
Hannam was born in 1885 in Burwood, New South Wales. He studied at the Sydney Technical College and was awarded a diploma in science. He was a founding member of the Wireless Institute of Australia.

== Antarctic expeditioner ==
Hannam was selected as part of the Australasian Antarctic Expedition. He helped to set up the wireless equipment on Macquarie Island. He is credited with being the first person to establish wireless contact with Australia from Antarctica. He set up the wireless equipment at the main base and remained at Cape Denison as wireless operator for two summers and a winter. On his departure in February 1913, Sidney Jeffryes took over his post as wireless operator.

== Military service ==
Circa 1910, Hannam was closely involved with Captain George Augustine Taylor in a number of successful demonstrations to the military as to the potential uses of wireless telegraphy. Following the commencement of World War I, Hannam enlisted on 2 June 1915 in the Australian Imperial Force, embarked for France and commenced duties in the field workshops. He was a large man and struggled with a number of medical issues. But his previous wireless experience was identified and he was transferred to the ANZAC Wireless Coy. The Wireless Coy. was eventually renamed Australian Army Signal Corps. He was discharged on 7 November 1919. He served as an engineer in the Australian Motor Transport Corps.

== Electrical business ==
After his war service, Hannam established an electrical business. He married Elizabeth Bielby in 1927. He died in 1965 in Terrigal.

== Legacy ==
- Founding member of Wireless Institute of Australia, the world's oldest established national radio body.
- With Taylor, Kirkby and Wilkinson, participated in early demonstration of wireless in Australian military.
- Hannam is credited as being the first person to play football on the Antarctic mainland.
- First use of wireless on Macquarie Island.
- First use of radio on Antarctica.
- In 1914 he was awarded the Polar Medal for his work on the expedition.
- The Hannam Islands, a group of three islands in Commonwealth Bay is named for him.
- The Australian Antarctic Divisions’ Walter Hannam Building honours his achievements.
- Awarded patent for "Improvements in rapid type electric water heaters for bath and other domestic service", subsequently successfully marketed
