= Cape Mawson =

Cape in Antarctica

Cape Mawson (69°59′S 74°40′W) is a low, ice-covered cape forming the southeastern extremity of Charcot Island, Antarctica. It was first seen from the air and roughly charted by Sir Hubert Wilkins on December 29, 1929, in a flight made around the island. The cape was named by Wilkins for Australian Antarctic explorer Sir Douglas Mawson, the leader of the Australasian Antarctic Expedition, 1911–14, and the British Australian New Zealand Antarctic Research Expedition, 1929–31. It was remapped in 1960 by D. Searle of the Falkland Islands Dependencies Survey from air photos taken by U.S. Navy Operation Highjump in 1947.
