= Madigan Nunatak =

Madigan Nunatak (67°9′S 143°21′E) is an isolated nunatak that rises above the continental ice, 18 nautical miles (33 km) south of Cape Gray, Antarctica. It was discovered by the Australasian Antarctic Expedition (1911–14) under Douglas Mawson, who named it for Cecil T. Madigan, the meteorologist with the expedition.
