= Mawson's Huts =

Buildings in the Australian Antarctic Territory

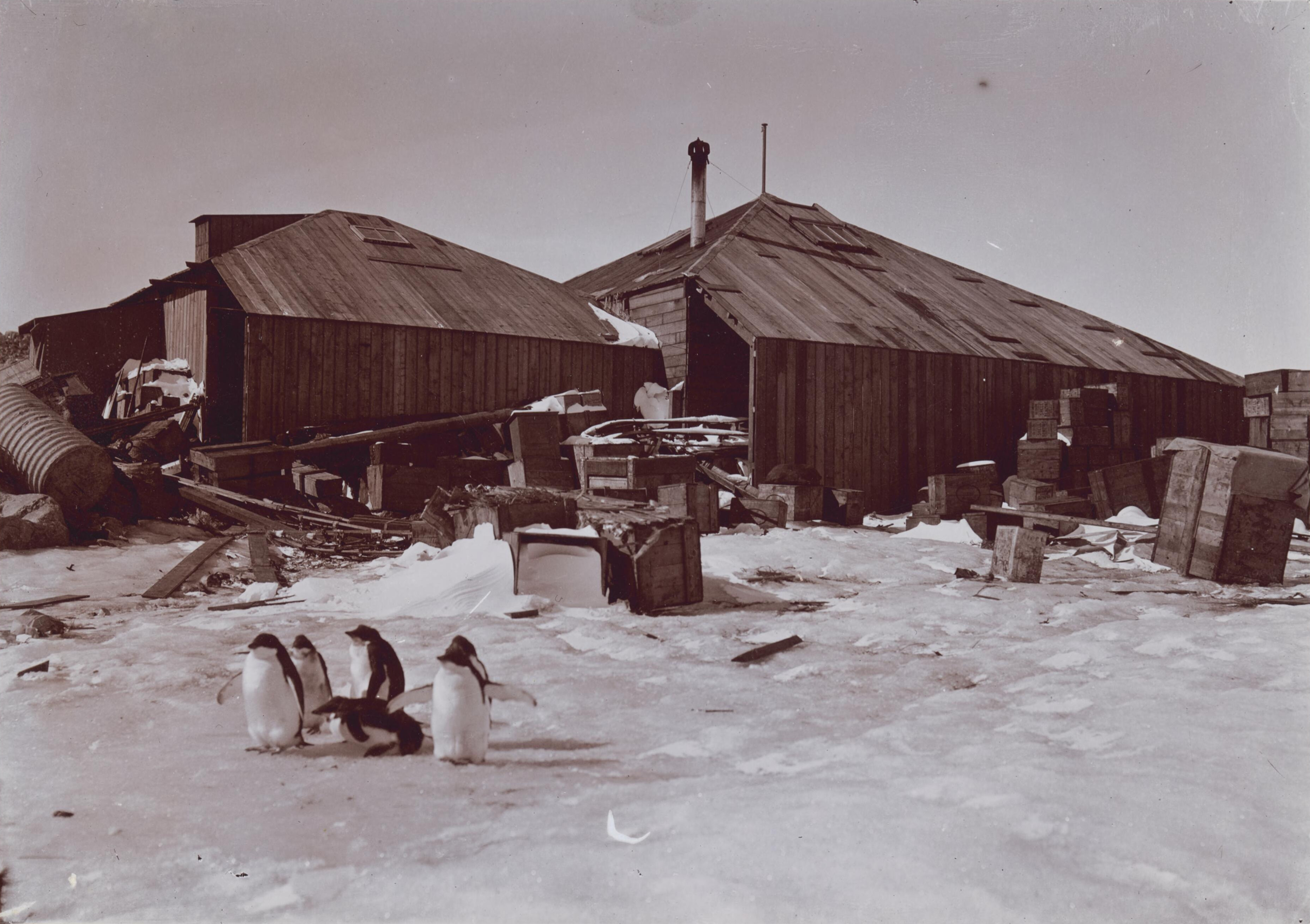
- View of Mawson's Huts during the Australasian Antarctic Expedition in 1911.

- Location within Antarctica

General information
- Coordinates: 67°00′31.6″S 142°39′39.7″E
- Year built: 1912

Mawson's Huts are a collection of buildings located at Cape Denison, in the far eastern sector of the Australian Antarctic Territory, some 3,000 km (1,900 mi) south of Hobart, Tasmania. The huts were erected and occupied by members of the Australasian Antarctic Expedition of 1911–1914, led by geologist and explorer Sir Douglas Mawson.

== Description ==
Mawson's Huts are rare as one of just six surviving sites from the Heroic Era of Antarctic exploration. The Australasian Antarctic Expedition (AAE) was the only such one during the Heroic Era organised, manned and supported primarily by Australians.

The huts included a magnetograph hut, used to measure variations in the south magnetic pole; an absolute magnetic hut, which was used as a reference point for studies in the magnetograph hut; and the transit hut, an astronomical observatory.

The most important building at the site is the winter living quarters, known as "Mawson's Hut". This pyramid-roofed hut was home to the eighteen men of the AAE main base party in 1912, and the seven (including Douglas Mawson) who stayed on for an unplanned second year in 1913. The hut combines two sections - the living quarters and the workshop, prefabricated in Sydney and Melbourne respectively, and shipped to the site for construction in 1912 by the AAE team.

=== The main hut ===
The main hut included facilities for 18 men, but it only measured 7.3 m × 7.3 m (24.0 ft × 24.0 ft), an area of 53 m^{2} (570 sq ft). The adjoining workshop measured 5.5 m × 4.9 m (18.0 ft × 16.1 ft), an area of 27 m^{2} (291 sq ft). On three sides the building is surrounded with 1.5 m (4.9 ft) wide verandas. The Verandas were used for many different things including housing the sled dogs.

The main hut contains a kitchen, a laundry, a storage room, and a sleeping room.

=== Radio ===
Using a wireless relay station on Macquarie Island, it was possible to contact the Australian mainland by radio. The AAE was the first expedition that had this possibility. Meteorological observations were transmitted by the system continuously. It was the first use of radio on the Antarctic continent.

== Conservation and heritage recognition ==
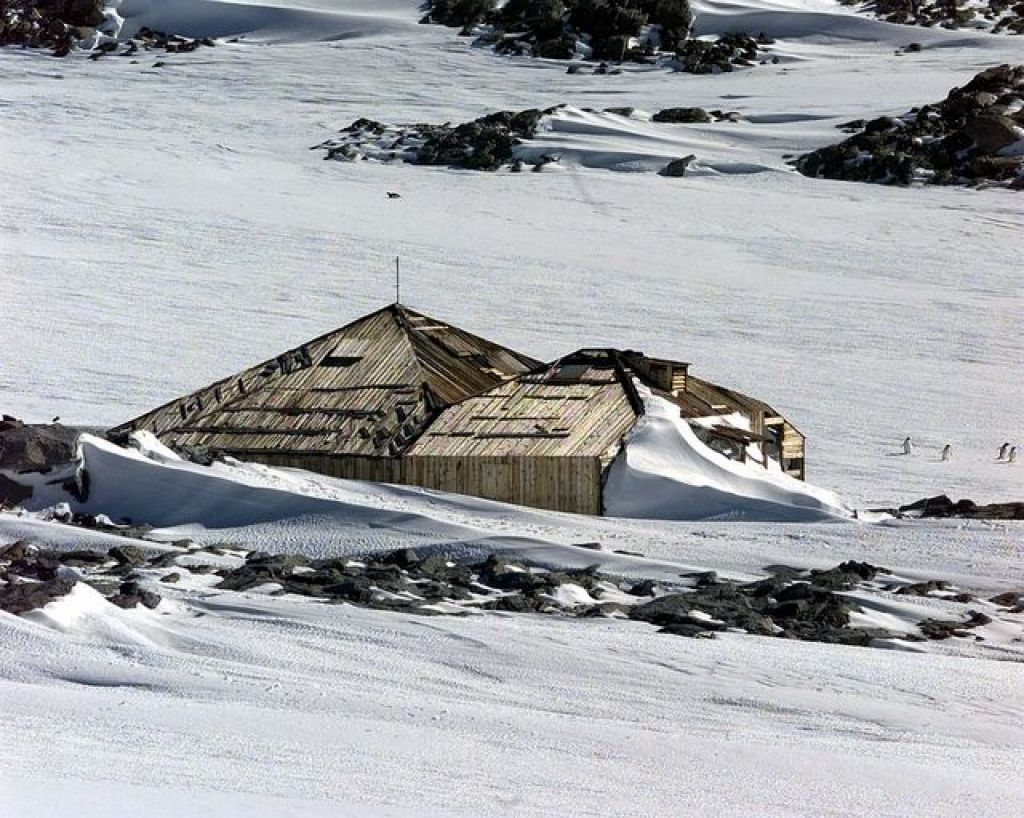
View of Mawson's Huts in February 2006, a year after the site was designated an Australian National Heritage Site.

Expeditions undertaken by the Australian Government (through the Australian Antarctic Division since the late 1970s) and private non-profit conservation organisations (notably the two Project Blizzard expeditions of 1984/85 and 1985/86, and the Mawson's Huts Foundation since 1997) have carried out conservation research, surveys and work on the huts. In addition to archaeological recording, removal of snow from inside the huts and ongoing maintenance, recent interventions (1998 and 2006) have been to encapsulate the failing timber roofs with new timber over-cladding in order to weatherproof the interiors.

The site is recognised under the Antarctic Treaty as a Historic Site & Monument (HSM 77) since 1972, and placed within an Antarctic Specially Protected Area (ASPA 162) and an Antarctic Specially Managed Area (ASMA 3) in 2004. It is also on the Australian National Heritage List, Commonwealth Heritage List and the defunct Register of the National Estate.

The Australian Antarctic Division and the Australian Minister for the Environment & Water Resources released for public comment a new management plan for the Mawson's Huts Historic Site in July 2007. The plan set out the principles that guided activities to preserve the heritage values of the site in the lead-up to the centenary of the Australasian Antarctic Expedition.

== Travel to Mawson's Huts ==
Chimu Adventures operate a voyage to Mawson's Huts every year from Hobart, Tasmania. The voyages generally stop at Macquarie Island en route and return via the New Zealand Subantarctic islands.

Aurora Expeditions is launching its third ship, the Douglas Mawson, which will begin operating from December 2025. As part of its Ross Sea & East Antarctica voyages, the ship will include visits to Mawson’s Huts.

== Mawson's Huts Replica Museum ==
The Mawson's Huts Replica Museum, opened in 2013 on the Hobart waterfront near the wharf used by SY Aurora, includes a replica of Mawson's Hut at Cape Denison. The replica hut was built by the Mawson's Huts Foundation, as part of an ongoing effort to raise funds for conservation work at Cape Denison. The museum also helps to educate visitors about Mawson and the Australasian Antarctic Expedition.

== Resources ==
- Australian Antarctic Division (2007 Mawson's Huts Historic Site Management Plan 2007-2012.
- Mackay, R (2005) 'Ice, icon and identity: the meaning of Mawson's huts'. In Lydon, J & Ireland, T (eds) Object Lessons: Archaeology & Heritage in Australia.
- Mawson, D (1915) Home of the Blizzard: being the story of the Australasian Antarctic Expedition, 1911-1914.
- Pearson, M (1992). 'Expedition huts in Antarctica: 1899-1917'. Polar Record 28, 167: 261-276.
