= John King Davis =

English-born Australian explorer and navigator (1884–1967)

John King Davis CBE
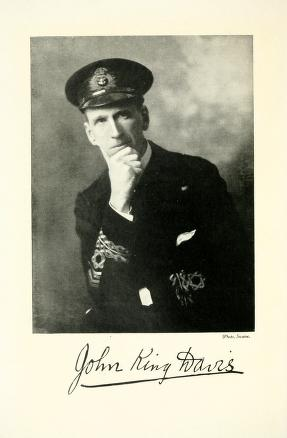
- Born: 19 February 1884; Kew, Surrey, England
- Died: 8 May 1967 (aged 83); Toorak, Victoria, Australia
- Resting place: Melbourne General Cemetery
- Other name: Gloomy
- Known for: Captain of SY Aurora

John King Davis CBE (19 February 1884 – 8 May 1967) was an English-born Australian explorer and navigator notable for his work captaining exploration ships in Antarctic waters as well as for establishing meteorological stations on Macquarie Island in the subantarctic and on Willis Island in the Coral Sea.

== Early life and education ==
John King Davis was born in Kew, Surrey, England, on 19 February 1884. He was the only son of James Green Davis, army coach, and his wife Marion Alice, née King.

Davis was educated at Colet Court, London, and Burford Grammar School, Oxfordshire. In 1900 he and his father left London for Cape Town, South Africa. When his father was absent on a visit to Kimberley, Davis ran away to join the crew of the mail-steamer Carisbrooke Castle, working as a steward's boy. Also in 1900, Davis signed indentures to serve for four years in the Merchant Navy and by 16 July 1905 he had passed the Board of Trade examination for the certificate of second mate.

== Career ==
Davis served as chief officer of the Nimrod during Ernest Shackleton's Antarctic expedition in 1908–1909. He was captain of the Aurora and second in command of Douglas Mawson's Australasian Antarctic expedition in 1911–1914.

At the outbreak of World War I in August 1914, Davis volunteered for active service, and was put in charge of the troop transport HMAT Boonah, carrying troops and horses to Egypt and England.

He also served as Captain of the Discovery in 1929–1930 in the course of the British Australian and New Zealand Antarctic Research Expedition.

Davis was Australia's Commonwealth Director of Navigation from 1920 to 1949. It was at the beginning of this period that he volunteered to personally set up the remote Willis Island meteorological and cyclone warning station in 1921–22. He was a contributor of articles to Walkabout.

== Other activities ==
Davis was president of the Royal Society of Victoria 1945–1946.

== Personal life and death ==
Davis served as best man to Douglas Mawson at his wedding to Paquita Mawson in Melbourne in March 1914.

Known in his lifetime as a "free thinker and plain speaker" and a "deepwater sailorman of the old school", Davis remained a lifelong bachelor.

He died on 8 May 1967 in Toorak, Victoria, aged 83. He was buried in an unmarked grave at Melbourne General Cemetery. In 2026, the ANARE Club helped sponsor a marker and plaque at Davis's grave.

== Recognition, honours, and legacy ==
Davis was named a Fellow of the Royal Geographical Society in 1915, winning their Murchison Award in the same year.

Davis Station in Antarctica was established in 1957 and is named after John King Davis, as is the Davis Sea, located off the Antarctic coast between longitudes 82°E and 96°E.

He was awarded the Polar Medal multiple times: in 1909 (Bronze clasp); 1915 (Silver clasp), 1917 (Bronze clasp), and 1934 (Bronze clasp). In 1964 he was appointed a Commander of the Order of the British Empire.

== Bibliography ==
Books authored by Davis include:

- (1919) With the Aurora in the Antarctic. Andrew Melrose: London
- (1921) Willis Island: a storm-warning station in the Coral Sea Critchley Parker: Melbourne.
- (1962) High Latitude (autobiography written in collaboration with Bedford Osborne) Melbourne University Press: Parkville, Victoria.
- (1997) Trial by Ice. The Antarctic Journals of John King Davis (Edited by Louise Crossley) Bluntisham Books and Erskine Press: Bluntisham and Norwich (ISBN 1-85297-047-2)
