= SY Aurora =

Steam yacht built in 1876

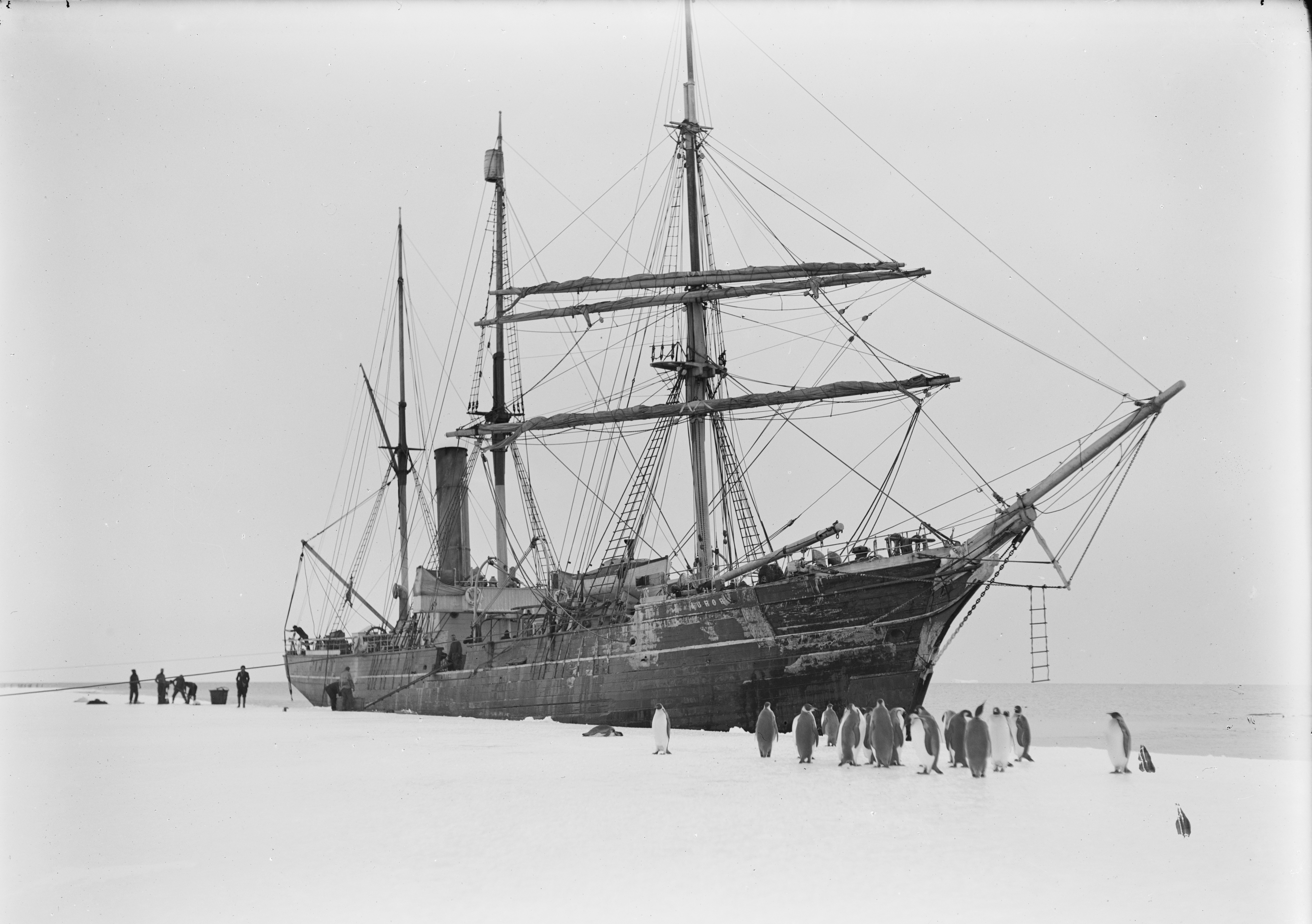
- SY Aurora anchored to floe-ice during the Australasian Antarctic Expedition

History

United Kingdom
- Builder: Alexander Stephen & Sons Ltd. Dundee, Scotland
- Launched: 1876
- Fate: Declared lost by Lloyd's of London, 2 January 1918

General characteristics
- Class & type: Steam yacht
- Tonnage: 580 grt; 380 nrt
- Length: 165 ft (50 m)
- Beam: 30.5 ft (9.3 m)
- Draught: 18.75 ft (5.72 m)
- Propulsion: Compound Steam Engine; Cunliffe and Dunlop of Glasgow; 98 bhp
- Sail plan: Barquentine

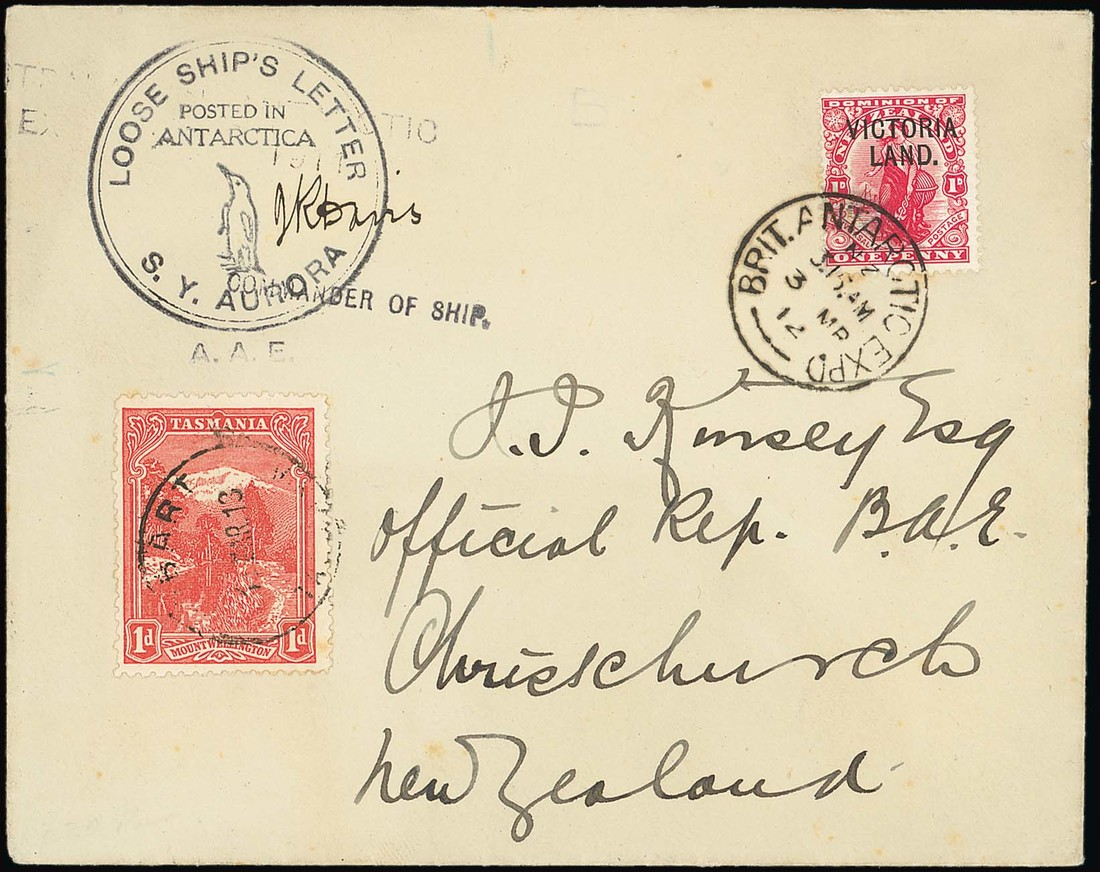
A 1912 envelope from the Aurora to New Zealand postmarked Hobart, 17 March 1913. From the John Clemente collection.

SY Aurora was a 580-ton barque-rigged steam yacht built by Alexander Stephen and Sons Ltd. in Dundee, Scotland, in 1876, for the Dundee Seal and Whale Fishing Company. She was 165 feet (50 m) long with a 30-foot (9.1 m) beam. The hull was made of oak, sheathed with greenheart and lined with fir. The bow was a mass of solid wood reinforced with steel-plate armour. The heavy side frames were braced by two levels of horizontal oak beams. Its primary use was whaling in the northern seas, and it was built sturdily enough to withstand the heavy weather and ice that would be encountered when in service. That strength proved useful for Antarctic exploration as well and between 1911 and 1917 it made five trips to the continent, for both exploration and rescue missions.

== Whaling ==
Between the years 1876 and 1910, Aurora made the annual trip from Dundee, Scotland to St. John's, Newfoundland to take part in whale and seal hunts in the North Atlantic. There were a couple of notable events in this time. In 1884, along with other whalers in the area Aurora made an attempt to rescue the controversial Greely Expedition, and its captain, James Fairweather assisted with a repair to the US relief ship Bear. In 1891, the ship came to the rescue of the crew of Polynia when it was crushed in sea ice.

== Australasian Antarctic Expedition ==
In 1910, it was bought by Douglas Mawson's deputy, Captain John King Davis, for £6,000 for his Australasian Antarctic Expedition. On 2 December 1911 Aurora departed from Hobart, Australia for Macquarie Island, where a radio relay station was established. It left the island on 25 December, arriving at Cape Denison on 8 January 1912, where the main base was built. It departed on 19 January, heading west to find a location for the western base, which was eventually sited in what is now known as Queen Mary Land, on 1 February 1912. After the western party was established on the stable ice shelf, Aurora left on 20 February, arriving in Hobart on 12 March.

In December 1912, Aurora returned to Cape Denison to find that the sledging expedition of Mawson, Xavier Mertz, and Belgrave Edward Sutton Ninnis was overdue. Davis had to pick up the party at the western base and risked the ship being iced in over the winter if he left it too long. He waited until 8 February but just after leaving, he received a wireless message asking him to turn back as Mawson had reached the base. He turned Aurora around but severe weather prevented the landing boat being put ashore, so, on the evening of 9 February, Davis decided he must steam west to fetch the western base party. Aurora reached the western base on 23 February, loaded quickly and headed north, arriving in Hobart on 15 March.

Over the subsequent months, Davis raised extensive rescue funds, and had the Aurora refit. Departing from Hobart on 15 November 1913, the ship collected the radio relay party under George Ainsworth at Macquarie Island, and sailed on to pick up the relief party at Cape Denison. It arrived in Commonwealth Bay on 3 December 1913 and left on 25 December. After an extensive coastal exploration and oceanographic work, it arrived back in Australia at Port Adelaide on 26 February 1914.

== Imperial Trans-Antarctic Expedition ==
In 1914, Sir Ernest Shackleton tasked Aurora and her crew with helping set up supply depots along the route for his Imperial Trans-Antarctic Expedition. After being delayed by sea ice in McMurdo Sound in January 1915, Aurora managed to make its way further south, and sent teams off to set up the depots. It eventually made its way to Discovery Bay on 12 March 1915, where it anchored and continued to offload supplies. In May, Aurora was trapped in the ice, and was carried out to the sea, stranding the men that were setting up the depots. It remained trapped in the ice for the better part of a year, drifting some 1600 nautical miles. It was not until 12 February 1916 that the ship escaped from the ice, making it back to Dunedin, New Zealand on 3 April.

=== 1917 Ross Sea Party rescue ===
The Australian, New Zealand and British governments agreed to fund the refit of Aurora for the rescue of the Ross Sea Party. An Advisory Committee was established in Melbourne, consisting of Rear Admiral Sir William Cresswell, Professor Sir Orme Masson, Captain J.R. Barter, Commander John Stevenson and Dr Griffith Taylor.

Shackleton's expedition funds were fully expended. After his legendary ordeal on Endurance in the Weddell Sea sector, Shackleton arrived in New Zealand during December 1916. The three governments involved were adamant that he would not lead the rescue expedition and at their insistence John King Davis was appointed to captain Aurora. After negotiation Shackleton sailed aboard Aurora, but Captain Davis had total authority on the voyage. On 10 January 1917, the ship pulled alongside the pack ice near Cape Royds and worked its way to Cape Evans. One week later, the seven survivors of the original ten members of the Ross Sea Party were headed back to Wellington, New Zealand aboard Aurora.

== Fate ==
Aurora was last seen in 1917, when she departed Newcastle, New South Wales, bound for Iquique, Chile with a cargo of coal. Lloyd's of London posted the ship as missing on 2 January 1918. It was believed that she was a casualty of World War I, possibly being sunk by a mine laid by the German merchant raider SMS Wolf. One of Aurora's lifebelts was recovered from the Tasman Sea between Sydney and Brisbane six months after her disappearance.

== Message on a bottle ==
In 1927, a G. Bressington was walking along the beach near Tuggerah, New South Wales and noticed an old wine bottle partly buried in the sand. Upon examining the bottle he saw an engraving of the picture of a ship and on the other side the following message: "Midwinter's Day, 1912, Shackleton Glacier, Antarctica. 'Frank Wild, A. L. Kennedy, S. Evan Jones, C. Arch. Hoadley, Charles T. Harrisson, George Dovers, A. L. Watson and Morton H. Moyes".

The story of the bottle is that it was one of three given to Sir Douglas Mawson when his expedition left England in 1911. The bottles were given by Mr J. T. Buchanan who had them left over from the Challenger expedition and wished the party to drink them on Explorer Day. Mawson passed one bottle on to Frank Wild, who led the Western Base Party whilst Aurora was under the command of John King Davis. When the wine was drunk on the day, the party's artist Harrisson engraved a picture of Aurora on one side and the names of the party on the other. It is thought the bottle was still aboard Aurora when it left Newcastle in 1917.

== Tributes ==
A number of Antarctic features are named for Aurora. These include:

- Aurora Glacier
- Aurora Heights
- Aurora Peak
- Aurora Subglacial Basin
- Mount Aurora

== Captains ==
This is a partial list of captains of Aurora:

- Alexander Fairweather (1880–1882)
- James Fairweather (1883–1888)
- Jackman (c. 1895)
- John King Davis (1911–1914, 1916–17)
- Lieutenant Æneas Mackintosh R.N.R. (1914)
- J R Stenhouse (1914–1916)

== See also ==
- List of Antarctic exploration ships from the Heroic Age, 1897–1922
