= List of administrative heads of Macquarie Island =

This is a list of Administrative Heads of Macquarie Island.

== Macquarie Island legal status ==
The following table outlines the legal status and administrative arrangements covering Macquarie Island.

Legal status	Term start	Term end	Comments	Reference
Macquarie Island claimed by the United Kingdom, annexed to the Colony of New South Wales	11 July 1810	2 December 1825	Frederick Hasselborough discovered the uninhabited island	
Responsible self-government established in New South Wales	1 January 1856			
Transferred to Tasmania	17 June 1890	ongoing		
Leasehold estate	1902	1920	Government of Tasmania grants lease to Joseph Hatch.	
Base for the Australasian Antarctic Expedition	1911	1914	Established under the command of Douglas Mawson	
Declared a wildlife sanctuary	17 May 1933			
Australian National Antarctic Research Expedition (ANARE) station	25 March 1948			
Macquarie Island Nature Reserve	1978			
Inscribed onto the UNESCO World Heritage List	5 December 1997	ongoing	A site of major geoconservation significance	
Macquarie Island Marine Park declared	27 October 1999	31 August 2007		
Macquarie Island Commonwealth Marine Reserve declared	31 August 2007	ongoing		

== Officers in charge Macquarie Island Meteorological Station ==
The following officers were appointed to manage the Macquarie Island Meteorological Station under the Director of the Australian Bureau of Meteorology.

No.	Name	Title	Term start	Term end	Time in office	Comments	Reference
1	George Ainsworth		1911	1913	1–2 years		
2	Harold Power		1913	1914	0–1 years		
3	Arthur Tulloch		1914	1915	0–1 years	Closure of meteorological station	

== See also ==
- Macquarie Island
- Australian Antarctic Territory
