= Antipodes Subantarctic Islands tundra =

Ecoregion

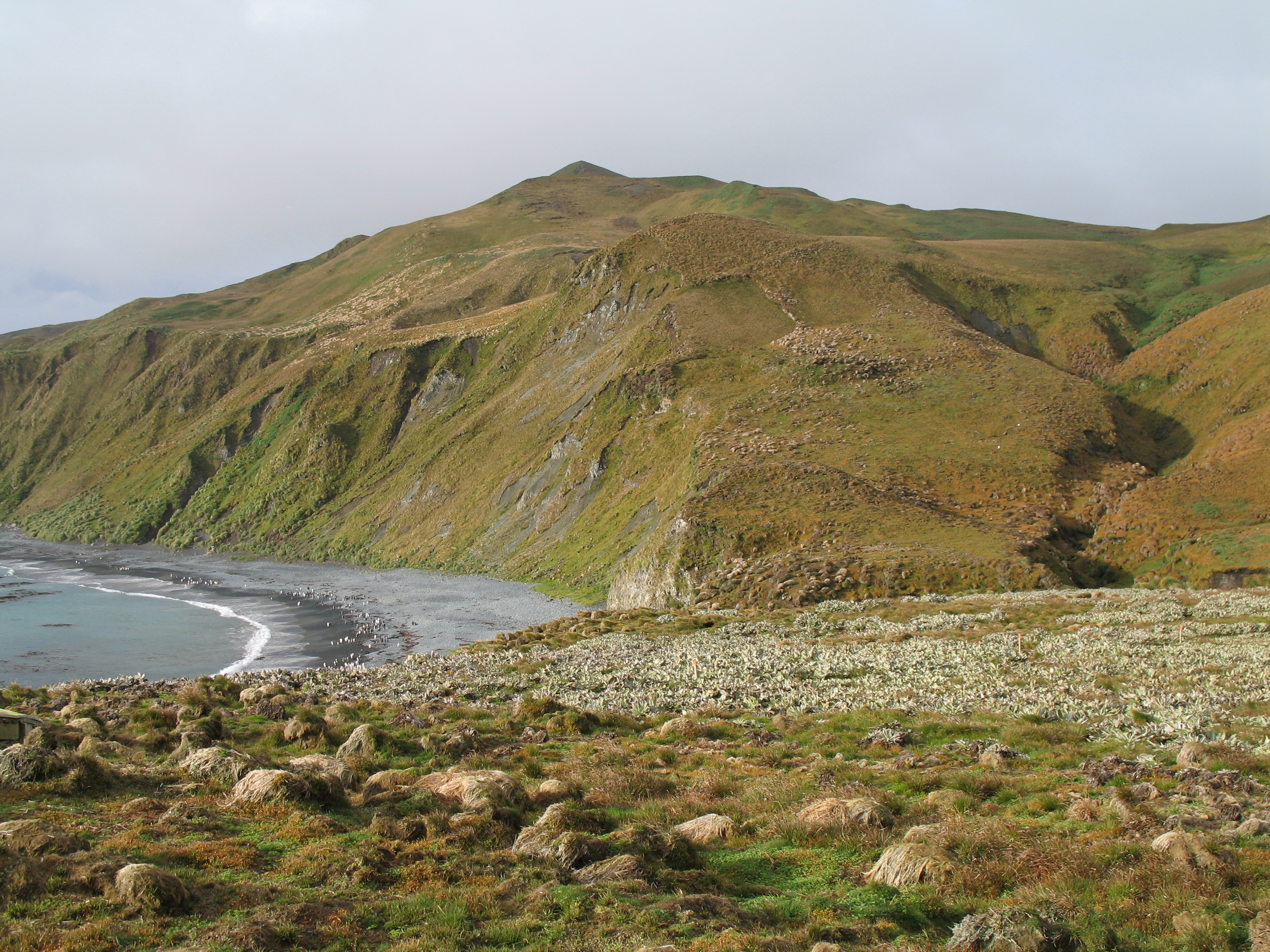
- Bluffs on Macquarie Island

- The position of the Antipodes Subantarctic Islands relative to New Zealand

Ecology
- Realm: Australasian
- Biome: tundra

Geography
- Area: 817 km^{2} (315 sq mi)
- Countries: Australia; New Zealand
- Coordinates: 50.71°S 166.11°E

Conservation
- Conservation status: Relatively stable/intact
- Protected: 116 km² (14%)

The Antipodes Subantarctic Islands tundra ecoregion, within the tundra biome, includes five remote island groups in the Pacific Ocean south of New Zealand: the Bounty Islands, Auckland Islands, Antipodes Islands and Campbell Island groups of New Zealand, and Macquarie Island of Australia.

== Location and description ==
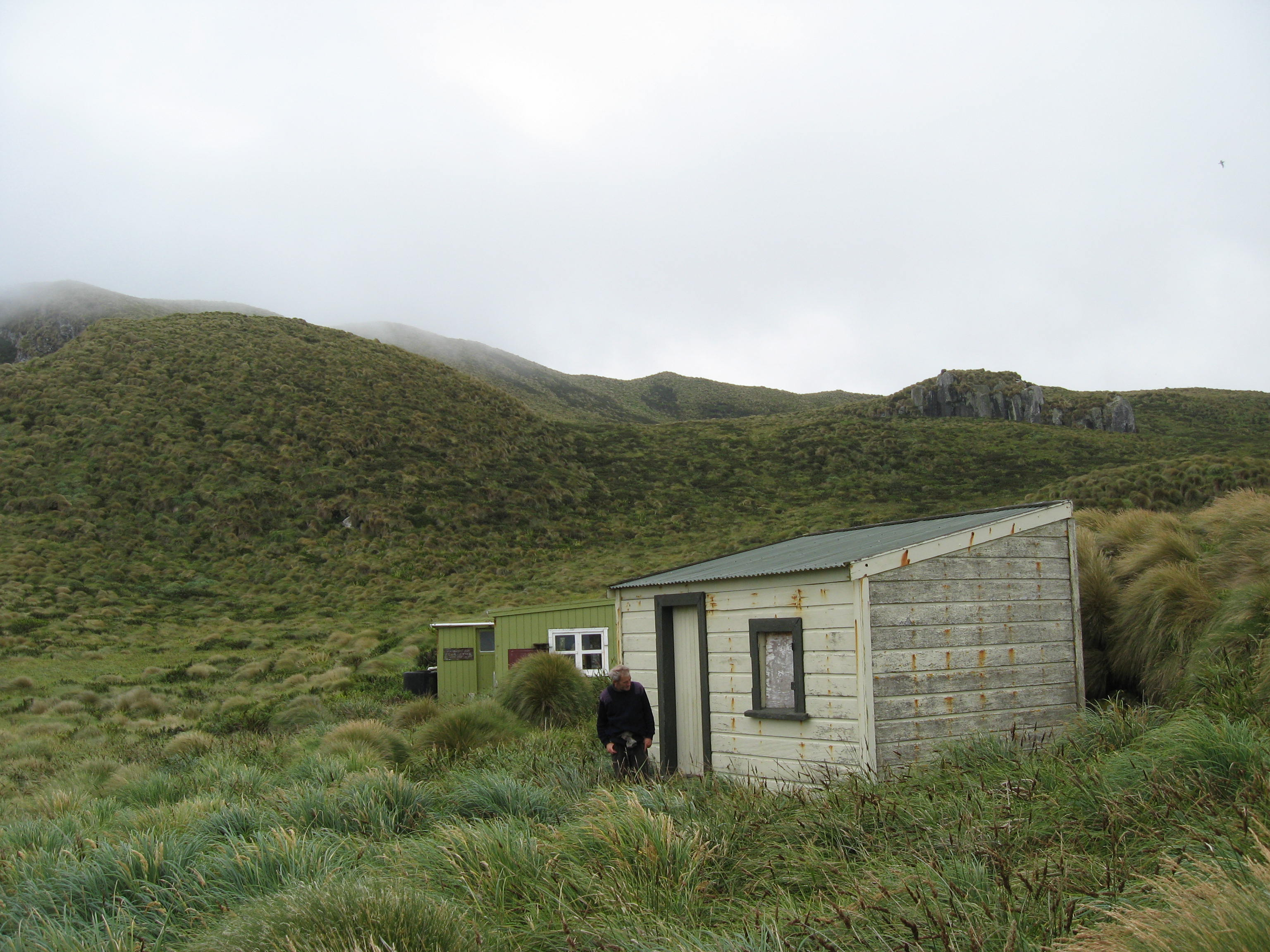
An old castaway hut on the Antipodes Islands.

The islands constituting this ecoregion share a long history of isolation, both from other landmasses and each other. The isolation, combined with harsh climates characterised by low temperatures, strong westerly winds and few hours of sunlight in winter, have resulted in the evolution of many endemic plants and animals, though species richness is relatively low. Wind speeds reach an average of 40 km/h (25 mph) while even in summer the thick cloud cover prevents much sunlight from penetrating.

The Bounty Islands are small granite rocks (with a maximum height of 88 m or 289 ft), while the small Antipodes Islands group (maximum height 366 m), the largest group the Auckland Islands (705 m or 2,313 ft) and Campbell Island (569 m or 1,867 ft) are volcanic in origin. Macquarie Island (433 m or 1,421 ft) is the furthest south and the coldest. Where present, soils are mainly boggy peats, up to 8 m (26.2 ft) deep in flat areas. None of the islands are inhabited although there are ongoing research projects including a permanent base of the Australian Antarctic Division on Macquarie Island.

== Flora ==
Vegetation may include low forests of Southern rātā in the more sheltered areas of the Aucklands and parts of Campbell Island, with tussock grassland, shrubland, herbfield, feldmark and cushion plants elsewhere. The islands represent a transition zone between the Antarctic to the south and temperate climates to the north. Individual species include many endemics, such as a Cyathea tree fern, which are not found any further south in the world, along with others that also occur in New Zealand and further north. Macquarie Island, being colder (average annual temperature 5 °C or 41 °F), does not sustain any wooded plants, while the small Bounty Islands lack soils and their flora is largely restricted to algae and lichens on the rocks. The islands are home to a number of rare plants, including a unique genus, the Auckland Island Pleurophyllum, and the only subantarctic orchids, Corybas dienemus and Corybas sulcatus of Macquarie Island.

== Fauna ==
There are no native land mammals, nor amphibians or reptiles. Marine mammals include five breeding species of seal; the southern elephant seal, Australasian fur seal, subantarctic fur seal, Antarctic fur seal and the rare New Zealand sea lion, 95% of the world's population of which breed on the Auckland Islands.

There are also large numbers of breeding penguins and other seabirds, including almost half of the world's species of albatross, especially the world's only breeding colonies of the Antipodean albatross (Diomedea exulans antipodensis), southern royal albatross (Diomedea epomophora epomophora), Campbell albatross (Thalassarche impavida), white-capped albatross (Thalassarche steadi), and Salvin's albatross (Thalassarche salvini). The large colonies of Salvin's albatross on the Bounty Islands build nests of feathers as there is no vegetation to use. There are also isolated populations of land birds that have presumably settled here, having been blown off course by ocean winds. Many of these have since evolved into unique species, including two endemic parakeets on Antipodes Island; the Antipodes parakeet (Cyanoramphus unicolor) and Reischek's parakeet (Cyanoramphus hochstetteri).

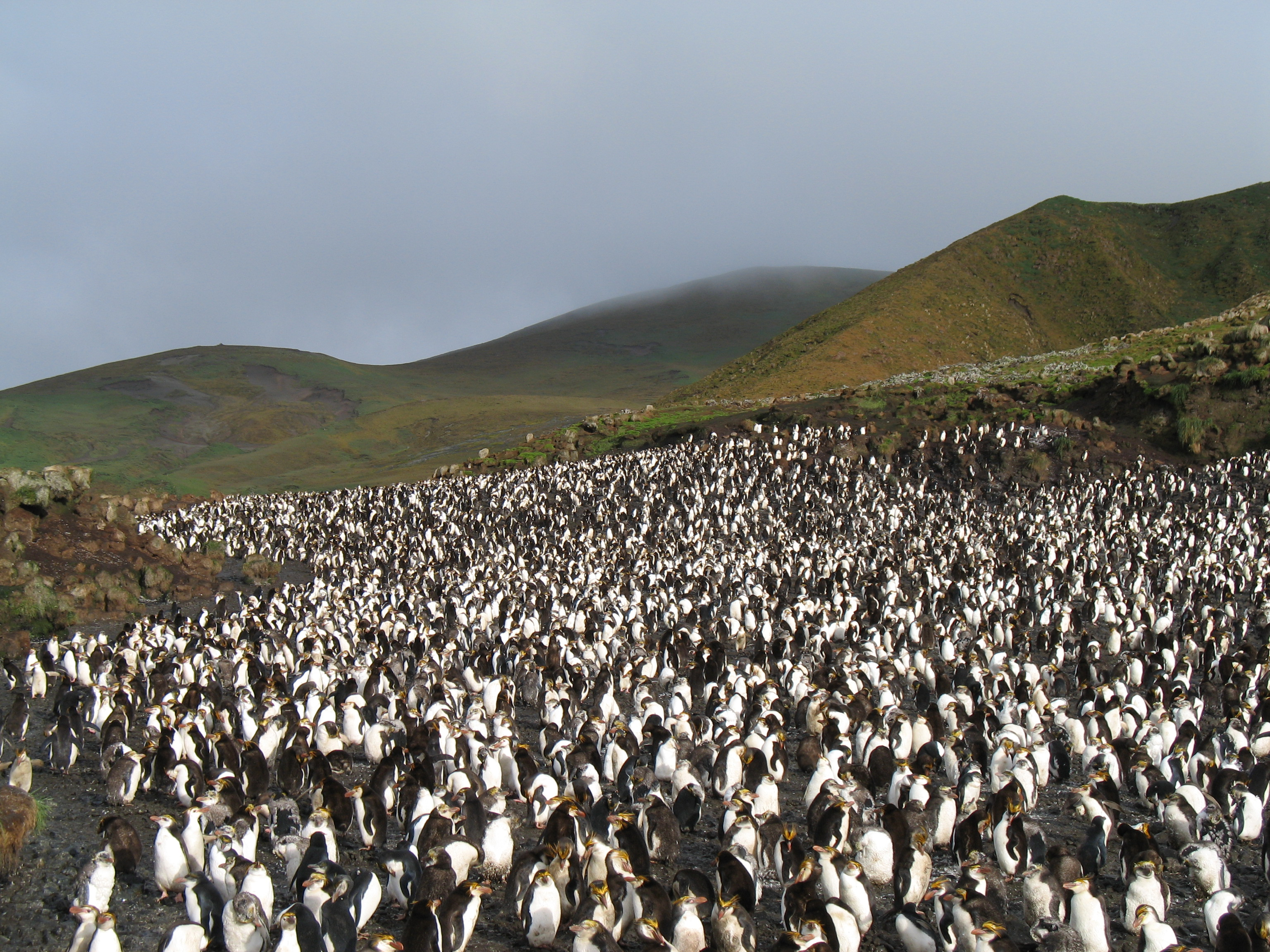
A royal penguin rookery on Macquarie Island.

Similarly, a high proportion of the Lepidoptera and other insects of the islands have evolved into unique endemic species.

A number of species have disappeared since the islands were discovered by humans, including the Macquarie Island rail and the Macquarie Island parakeet.

== Threats and preservation ==
Although the islands have been partially occupied at various times the habitats remain largely unspoilt. However, introduced animals prey on native wildlife and graze on the plant cover while both mammals and seabirds are vulnerable to entanglement in deep-sea fishing equipment. Longline fishing for tuna and trawling for squid are particularly damaging.

Current predators on the islands include rats and cats which are being systematically removed while cautionary procedures have been implemented to prevent more alien species from establishing. All cats have now been removed from Macquarie Island and there appears to have been an immediate increase in some seabird populations. All of the islands are nature reserves, World Heritage Sites and (except for the Bounty Islands) a Centre of Plant Diversity. Permission to land must be obtained from the Department of Conservation (New Zealand) for the New Zealand islands and the Tasmania Parks and Wildlife Service for Macquarie.
