= Macquarie Island orchid =

Macquarie Island orchid may refer to:

- Nematoceras dienemum, windswept helmet orchid
- Nematoceras sulcatum, grooved helmet orchid
