= Macquarie Island =

Subantarctic island of Australia

Nickname: Macca
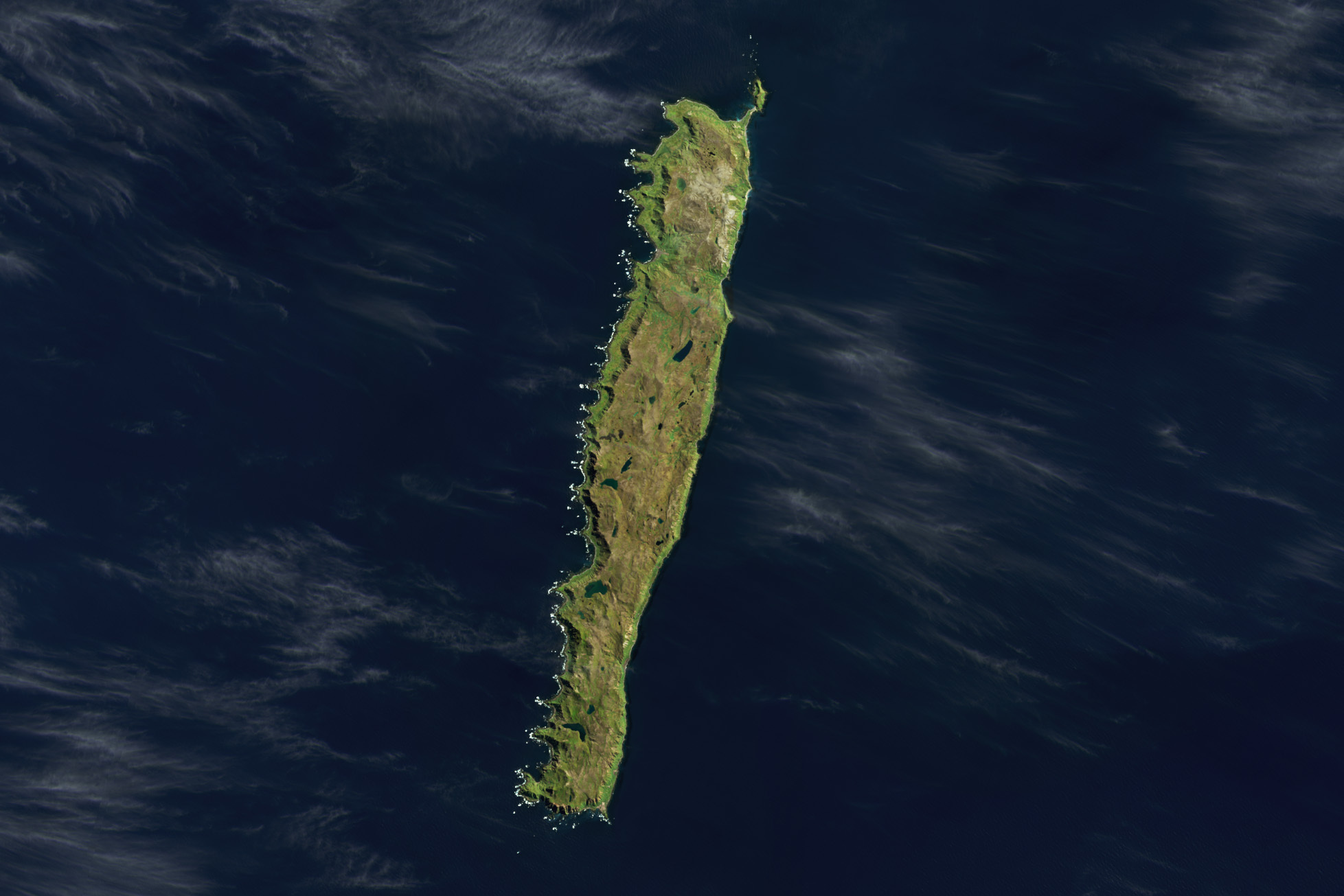
- Satellite photo of Macquarie Island

- Location within Oceania

Geography
- Location: Southwestern Pacific Ocean
- Coordinates: 54.63°S 158.86°E
- Area: 128 km^{2} (49 sq mi)
- Length: 35 km (21.7 mi)
- Width: 5 km (3.1 mi)
- Highest elevation: 410 m (1350 ft)
- Highest point: Mount Hamilton; Mount Fletcher

Administration
- Australia
- State: Tasmania
- LGA: Huon Valley Council

Demographics
- Population: No permanent inhabitants

Additional information
- Time zone: AEST (UTC+10:00)
  - Summer (DST): AEDT (UTC+11:00)

UNESCO World Heritage Site
- Criteria: Natural: vii, viii
- Reference: 629
- Inscription: 1997 (21st Session)

Macquarie Island is a subantarctic island in the south-western Pacific Ocean, about halfway between Tasmania and Antarctica. It has been governed as a part of Tasmania, Australia, since 1880. It became a Tasmanian State Reserve in 1978 and was inscribed as a UNESCO World Heritage Site in 1997.

Macquarie Island is an exposed portion of the Macquarie Ridge and is located where the Australian plate meets the Pacific plate.

The island is home to the entire royal penguin population during their annual nesting season. Ecologically, the island is part of the Antipodes Subantarctic Islands tundra ecoregion.

== History ==
=== Pre-European history ===
Unlike the Auckland Islands to the north east, no archaeological evidence has been found of pre-European settlement on Macquarie Island. The island's remoteness, lack of tree cover and severe climate may have mitigated against this, and are relevant to its late European discovery.

Wood from a shipwreck of unknown age was found on the island in 1811, which was never subjected to proper archaeological scrutiny. Macquarie Island has had archaeological surveys in the past few decades which included investigations of sea caves, where it was considered likely visitors would shelter.

=== 19th century ===
Frederick Hasselborough, an Australian, discovered the uninhabited island on 11 July 1810, while looking for new sealing grounds. He claimed Macquarie Island for Britain and annexed it to the colony of New South Wales in 1810. The island was named for Colonel Lachlan Macquarie, Governor of New South Wales from 1810 to 1821. Hasselborough reported a wreck "of ancient design", which has given rise to speculation that the island may have been visited before by Polynesians or others. In the same year, Captain Smith described in more detail what is presumably the same wreck and incorrectly speculated that it belonged to French explorer Jean-François de Galaup, comte de Lapérouse: "several pieces of wreck of a large vessel on this Island, apparently very old and high up in the grass, probably the remains of the ship of the unfortunate De la Perouse".

Between 1810 and 1919, seals and then penguins were hunted for their oil almost to the point of extinction. Sealers' relics include iron try pots, casks, hut ruins, graves and inscriptions. During that time, 144 vessel visits are recorded, 12 of which ended in shipwreck. The conditions on the island and the surrounding seas were considered so harsh that a plan to use it as a penal settlement was rejected.

Richard Siddins and his crew were shipwrecked in Hasselborough Bay on 11 June 1812. Joseph Underwood sent the ship Elizabeth and Mary to the island to rescue the remaining crew. The Russian explorer Fabian Gottlieb von Bellingshausen explored the area for Alexander I of Russia in 1820, and produced the first map of Macquarie Island. Bellingshausen landed on the island on 28 November 1820, defined its geographical position and traded his rum and food for the island's fauna with the sealers.

In 1877, the crew of the schooner Bencleugh was shipwrecked on the island for four months; folklore says they came to believe there was hidden treasure on the island. The ship's owner, John Sen Inches Thomson, wrote a book on his sea travels, including his time on the island. The book, written in 1912, was entitled Voyages and Wanderings in Far-off Seas and Lands.

==== Tasmania–New Zealand seal skin dispute ====
Macquarie Island was made a constituent part of Tasmania on 17 June 1880 through Letters Patent for the Governor of Tasmania.

In 1890, the Colony of New Zealand wrote to Lord Onslow (the Governor of New Zealand), Philip Fysh (the Premier of Tasmania), and the Lord Knutsford (the Secretary of State for the Colonies) regarding the island, initially requesting permission to annex the island, then requesting its transfer from the Colony of Tasmania, as this would close a loophole in New Zealand's closed sealing season when vessels were poaching on sub-Antarctic islands under the Colony's jurisdiction but claiming they got the seal skins from Macquarie Island. On the recommendation of Fysh, the Tasmanian Legislative Council passed a motion on 24 July 1890 requesting the "necessary steps be taken" for Macquarie Island to be transferred to New Zealand. Fysh was in no hurry to complete this process, and the request was only officially transmitted to the Tasmanian Legislative Assembly on 28 August 1890.

When the Legislative Assembly considered the matter on 2 September 1890, the virtue of transferring a dependent island was questioned, and (after several points of order and jokes from members) the assembly deferred consideration until the following day (effectively denying the transfer). By October 1890, it was certain that Tasmania would not condone the transfer of the island to New Zealand. Sir Harry Atkinson (Premier of New Zealand) expressed his regrets that Tasmania had decided against the transfer, with Fysh noting that all of New Zealand's stated objectives could be achieved under existing Tasmanian legislation and through inter-colonial agreements. In mid October 1890, The Southland Times was reporting that an explanation was forthcoming from Wellington. On 23 October 1890, Fysh formally advised New Zealand of the colonial legislature's refusal to transfer the island, and on 20 November 1890 Knutsford formally advised Onslow that the British government had not consented to any transfer.

On 20 April 1891, regulations issued by the Tasmanian Commissioner of Fisheries for the protection of seals on Macquarie Island came into effect. This was possible under existing Tasmanian legislation, namely the Fisheries Act 1889. By 26 October 1891, these regulations were amended to expire on 20 July 1894, and to no longer include the forfeiture of a vessel as penalty for the offence.

=== 20th century ===
Between 1902 and 1920, the Tasmanian Government leased the island to Joseph Hatch (1837–1928) for his oil industry based on harvesting penguins.

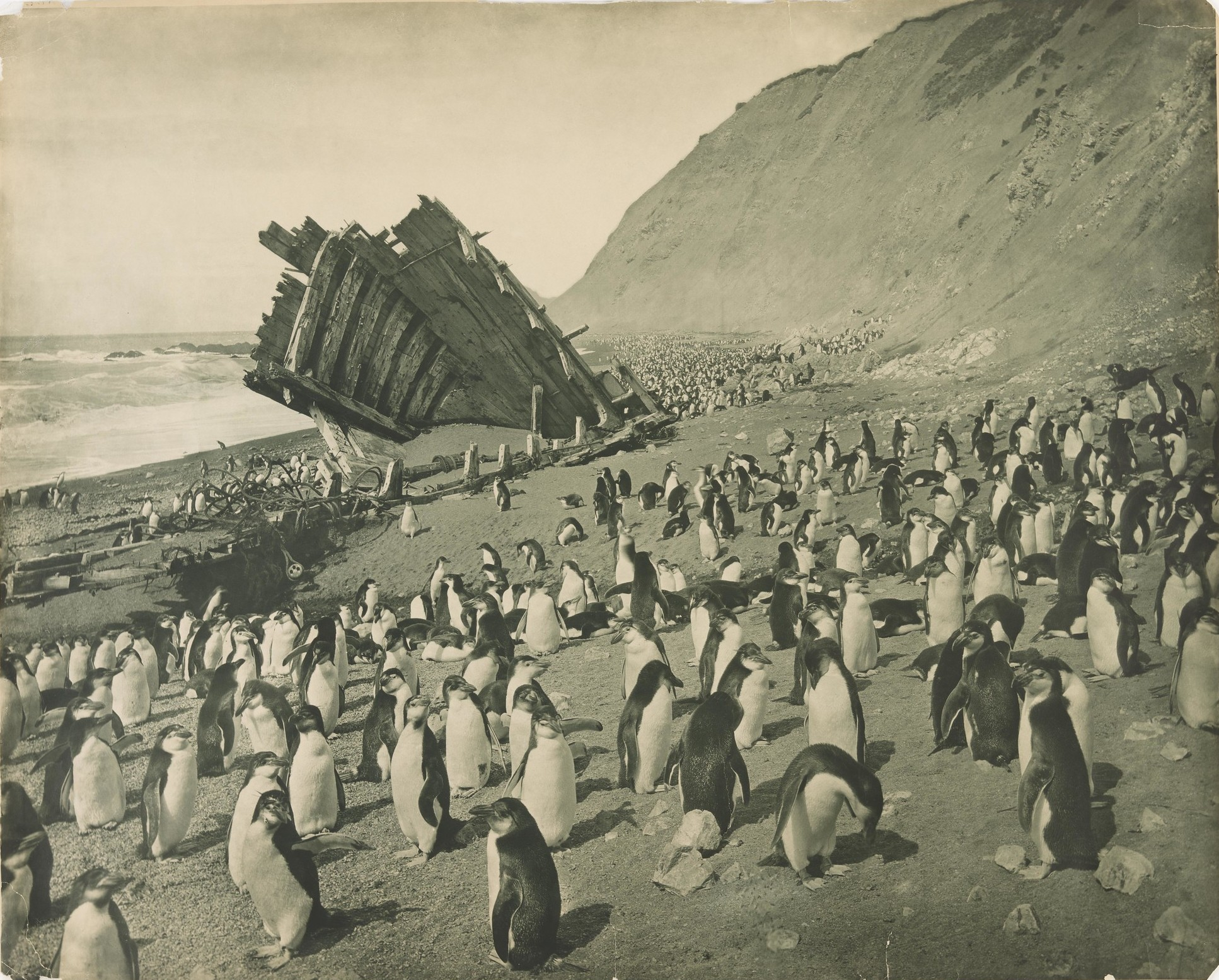
Penguins and remains of the wreck of The Gratitude, Nuggets Beach, Macquarie Island, 1911, Frank Hurley

Between 1911 and 1914, the island became a base for the Australasian Antarctic Expedition under Sir Douglas Mawson. George Ainsworth operated a meteorological station between 1911 and 1913, followed by Harold Power from 1913 to 1914, and by Arthur Tulloch from 1914 until the station was shut down in 1915.

In 1933, the authorities declared the island a wildlife sanctuary under the Tasmanian Animals and Birds Protection Act 1928 and, in 1972, it was made a State Reserve under the Tasmanian National Parks and Wildlife Act 1970. On 25 May 1948, the Australian National Antarctic Research Expeditions (ANARE) established its expedition headquarters on Macquarie Island. In March 1949, they were visited by the Fifth French Antarctic Expedition on their return trip from Adélie Land where any landing was made impossible due to extensive pack ice that year.

The island had status as a biosphere reserve under the Man and the Biosphere Programme from 1977 until its withdrawal from the program in 2011. On 5 December 1997, Macquarie Island was inscribed on the UNESCO World Heritage List as a site of major geoconservation significance, being the only mid-ocean ridge on Earth where rocks from the Earth's mantle are being actively exposed above sea-level.

=== 21st century ===
On 23 December 2004, an earthquake measuring 8.1 on the moment magnitude scale rocked the island but caused no significant damage. Geoscience Australia issued a Tsunami Inundation Advice for Macquarie Island Station. The paper indicated that a tsunami caused by a local earthquake could occur with no warning, and could inundate the isthmus and its existing station. Such a tsunami would likely affect other parts of the coastline and field huts located close to the shore. According to several papers, an earthquake capable of causing a tsunami of that significance is a high risk.

In August 2026, the Australian Antarctic Division announced that they would be withdrawing all personnel from the Macquarie Island Station, because the expected arrival of the H5N1 bird flu virus was forecast to lead to mass mortality in the colony of 2,500 elephant seals adjacent to the base. There have been no necropsies on other elephant seal populations to determine if bird flu has caused deaths. The withdrawal of 24 personnel from Macquarie Island was to avoid the predicted psychological effects of living for an extended period within a mass mortality event. The planned rebuild of the $371 million Macquarie station would be delayed.

== Geography ==
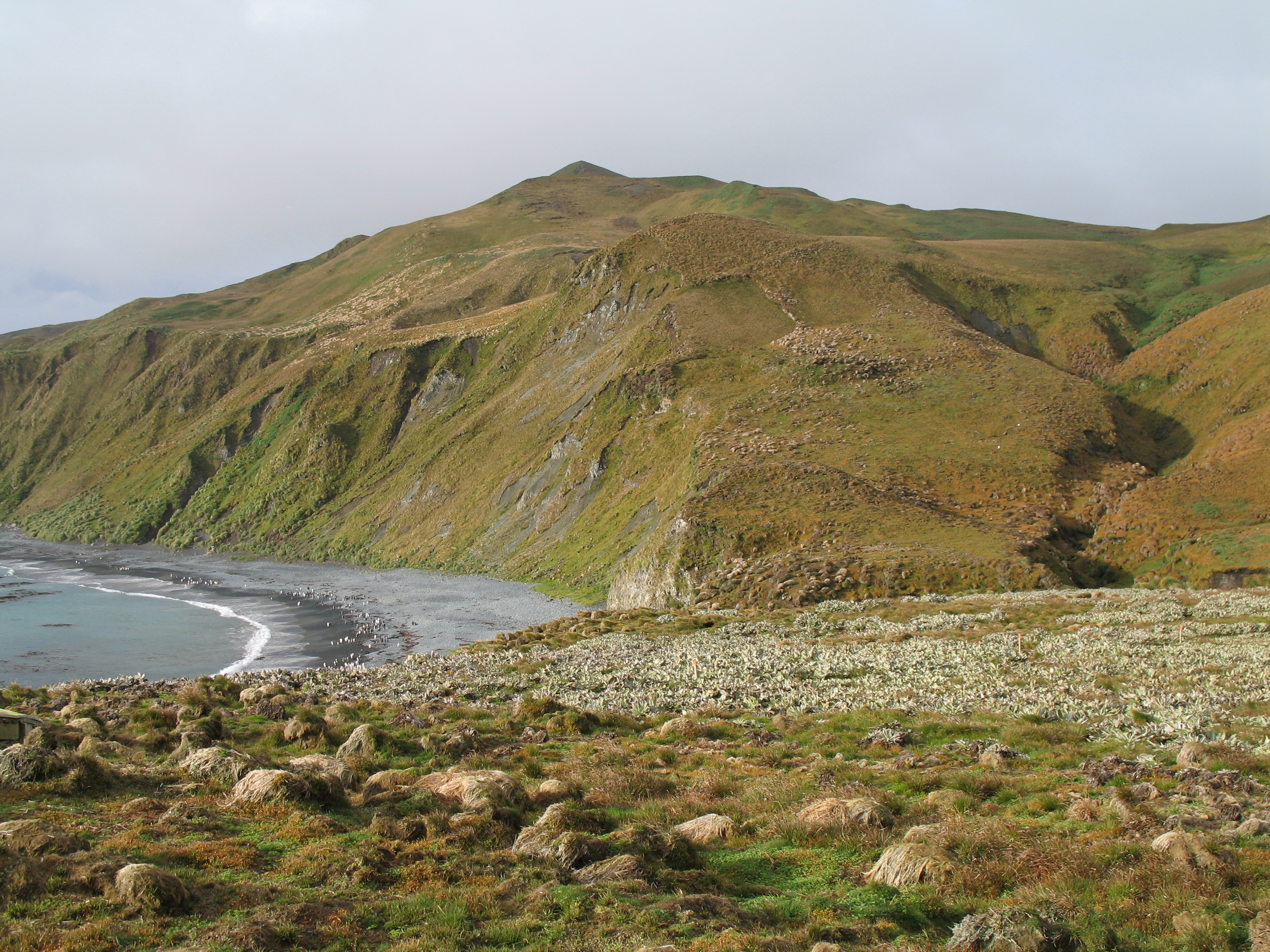
Macquarie Island bluffs

Macquarie Island is located 1500 kilometres (930 mi) south-east of Tasmania, approximately halfway between Tasmania and the Antarctic continent, and 1,000 kilometres (620 mi) south-west of New Zealand's South Island. It has a width of about 5 kilometres (3.1 mi) and a length of about 34 kilometres (21 mi), with an area of approximately 128 square kilometres (49 sq mi). The island is largely composed of plateaus with an elevation of about 200 metres (660 ft), surrounded by steep cliffs with slopes typically between 40° and 45°. Parts of the island's coast feature raised beaches and sea stacks, particularly on the north-western side of the island.

The island can be divided into three plateaus. The southern plateau has the highest elevation and features the island's highest point, Mount Hamilton, which has an elevation of 433 metres (1421 ft). It also contains a lake known as Waterfall Lake. The northern plateau has an elevation of around 200–250 metres (660–820 ft). The central plateau has a similar elevation and features two large basins: Skua Lake on the western side of the island, and Green Gorge on the eastern side. It also features several lakes, including Flynn Lake, Gratitude Lake, and Tiobunga Lake. On the island's northern side, a narrow isthmus connects Wireless Hill to the island. The island contains a total of 20 named lakes, as well as a small number of lagoons and tarns. The largest lake, Major Lake, has an area of 0.5 square kilometres (0.19 sq mi) and a maximum depth of 16.2 metres (53 ft). The deepest lake is Prion Lake, with a depth of 32.3 metres (106 ft). Due to the island's strong westerly winds, the lakes on the western side of the island have particularly high concentrations of sea salt compounds.

Two small groups of islands are located nearby: the Judge and Clerk Islands sit 33 kilometres (21 mi) north of Macquarie Island, while the Bishop and Clerk Islands are located 14 kilometres (8.7 mi) south of the island.

In the 19th century a phantom island named "Emerald Island" was believed to lie south of Macquarie Island.

== Geology ==
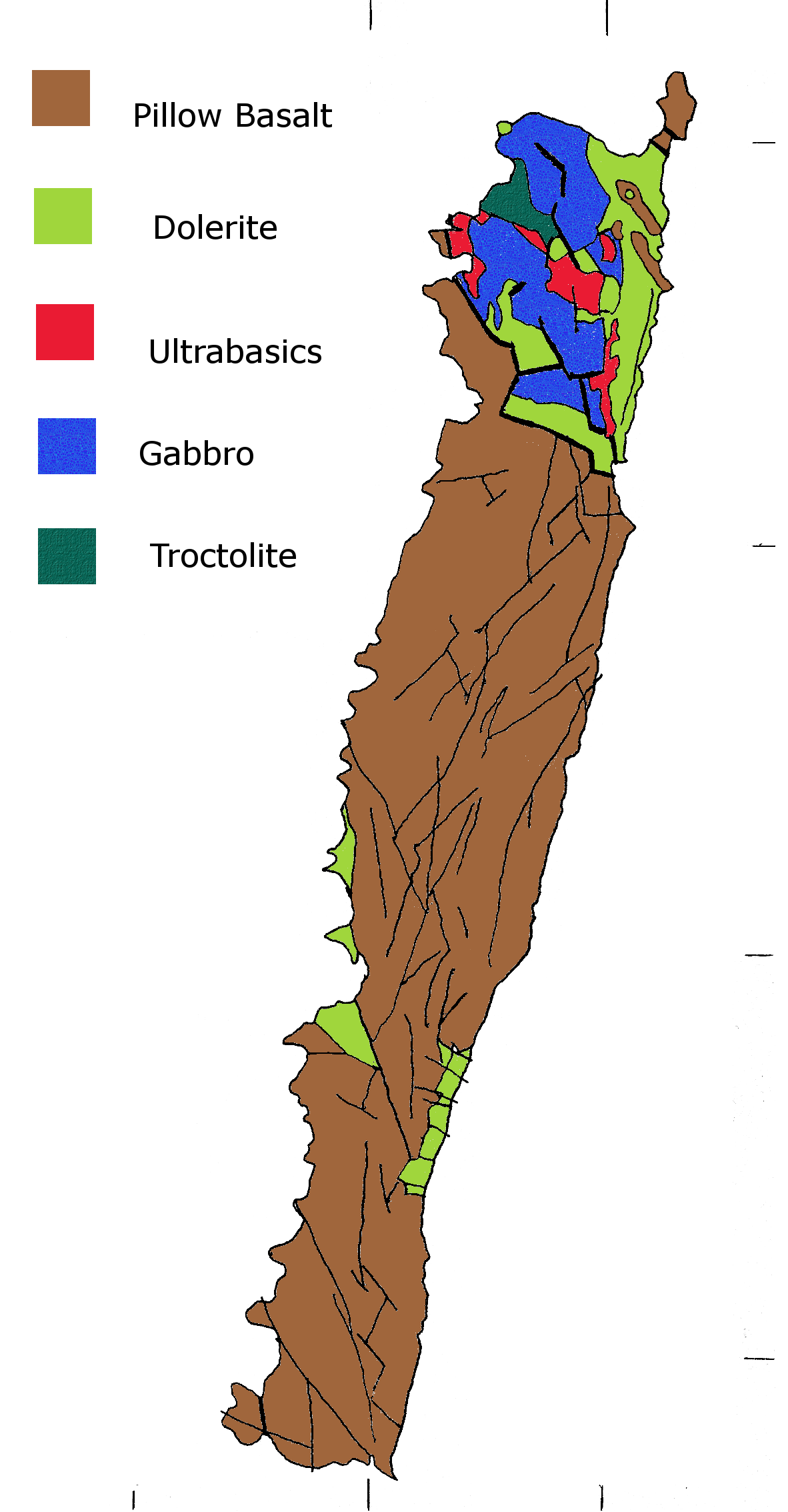
Simplified geological map

Macquarie Island is part of the Macquarie Ridge complex and lies on the tectonic plate boundary between the Australian plate and the Pacific plate. The rocks on the island were formed through accretion during periods of seafloor spreading on the tectonic ridge. Scientists have identified three distinct blocks of rock that compose the island, which have each seen different patterns and directions of shifting and rotation. The rocks of the island are believed to have formed roughly 27–30 million years ago during the Oligocene epoch. The island also contains a layer of pillow basalts that formed about 10 million years ago. It is believed that the island emerged above sea level about 80,000–300,000 years ago.

Macquarie Island has long been studied by geologists as one of the few ophiolites (exposed sections of oceanic crust) on Earth. The majority of the island's visible landscape is composed of pillow basalt formed by underwater lava flows, which is interspersed by oozes dating to the Pliocene epoch. The northern third of the island includes areas of peridotite, gabbro, and dolerite. Two areas on the eastern side of the island feature dolerite dyke swarms, some of which include areas of exposed gabbro and troctolite.

While the earliest researchers to study Macquarie Island believed that the island's geography had been shaped by thick glaciers present during the most recent glacial maximum, scientists have questioned the historical presence and extent of glaciers on the island. Modern researchers have suggested that tectonic activity, rather than glaciation, has been the dominant factor in shaping the island's geomorphology. The geography of Macquarie Island has been shaped by fault activity, and the island continues to rise at a rate estimated at 0.1–0.5 centimetres (0.039–0.197 inches) per year.

The Macquarie ridge lies entirely on the seafloor except for where it rises above sea level at Macquarie Island. The island emerged above sea level in recent geologic time – the highest points on the island may have emerged above the sea as recently as 300,000 years ago or less. The estimates vary based on the assumed rate of uplift and the changes in sea level over time. The island is an example of an ophiolite – a section of Earth's oceanic crust and the underlying upper mantle that has been uplifted and exposed. The process has been described as "the island itself seems to have been simply squeezed toward the surface like toothpaste from a tube". The unique exposures include excellent examples of pillow basalts without any hint of continental crust contamination and other extrusive rocks. The geology of the island has been described as revealing "the best exposed and most isolated pieces of the ocean floor in the world". The unique geological exposures were one of the two criteria cited when the island was listed as a UNESCO World Heritage Site in 1997.

== Climate ==
Macquarie Island's climate is highly consistent throughout the year and is characterised by cool temperatures and strong winds. The island experiences high winds, largely from the north and north-west. In 1983–1984, average annual wind speeds were about 33 kilometres per hour, with gales exceeding 63 kilometres per hour recorded on 76 days of the year. Average annual rainfall is about 900 mm. Mean annual temperatures have risen by about 1° Celsius since 1949. Unlike the majority of sub-Antarctic islands, Macquarie Island has no permanent snow.

Average daily maximum temperatures range from 4.9 °C (40.8 °F) in July to 8.8 °C (47.8 °F) in January. Precipitation occurs fairly evenly throughout the year and averages 1,002.1 mm (39.45 in) annually. Macquarie Island is one of the cloudiest places on Earth with an annual average of only 862 hours of sunshine (similar to Tórshavn in the Faroe Islands). Annually, there are an average of 289.4 cloudy days and just 3.5 clear days.

There are 316.7 precipitation days annually, including 55.7 snowy days (being equal to Charlotte Pass on this metric). This is a considerably lower figure than at Heard Island due to its longitude, which receives 96.8 snowy days at only 53 degrees south.

Climate data for Macquarie Island (1991–2020, extremes 1948–2025); 6 m AMSL; 54.50° S, 158.94° E
Month	Jan	Feb	Mar	Apr	May	Jun	Jul	Aug	Sep	Oct	Nov	Dec	Year
Record high °C (°F)	13.6 (56.5)	17.0 (62.6)	12.6 (54.7)	12.2 (54.0)	10.0 (50.0)	10.6 (51.1)	8.3 (46.9)	8.5 (47.3)	9.5 (49.1)	10.3 (50.5)	11.6 (52.9)	14.4 (57.9)	17.0 (62.6)
Mean maximum °C (°F)	11.0 (51.8)	10.6 (51.1)	10.1 (50.2)	9.2 (48.6)	8.4 (47.1)	7.6 (45.7)	7.2 (45.0)	7.1 (44.8)	7.3 (45.1)	7.9 (46.2)	9.0 (48.2)	10.4 (50.7)	11.4 (52.5)
Mean daily maximum °C (°F)	8.9 (48.0)	8.8 (47.8)	8.2 (46.8)	7.2 (45.0)	6.1 (43.0)	5.2 (41.4)	4.9 (40.8)	5.1 (41.2)	5.4 (41.7)	6.0 (42.8)	6.8 (44.2)	8.2 (46.8)	6.7 (44.1)
Daily mean °C (°F)	7.1 (44.8)	7.1 (44.8)	6.6 (43.9)	5.7 (42.3)	4.4 (39.9)	3.5 (38.3)	3.3 (37.9)	3.4 (38.1)	3.6 (38.5)	4.1 (39.4)	4.9 (40.8)	6.4 (43.5)	5.0 (41.0)
Mean daily minimum °C (°F)	5.3 (41.5)	5.4 (41.7)	4.9 (40.8)	4.1 (39.4)	2.7 (36.9)	1.7 (35.1)	1.6 (34.9)	1.6 (34.9)	1.8 (35.2)	2.1 (35.8)	2.9 (37.2)	4.5 (40.1)	3.2 (37.8)
Mean minimum °C (°F)	2.5 (36.5)	2.5 (36.5)	1.5 (34.7)	0.1 (32.2)	−2.5 (27.5)	−3.4 (25.9)	−3.8 (25.2)	−3.0 (26.6)	−3.1 (26.4)	−1.9 (28.6)	−1.0 (30.2)	1.2 (34.2)	−5.7 (21.7)
Record low °C (°F)	0.6 (33.1)	−0.6 (30.9)	−2.3 (27.9)	−4.5 (23.9)	−6.8 (19.8)	−7.0 (19.4)	−9.4 (15.1)	−8.9 (16.0)	−8.7 (16.3)	−6.0 (21.2)	−3.9 (25.0)	−1.7 (28.9)	−9.4 (15.1)
Average precipitation mm (inches)	94.9 (3.74)	89.4 (3.52)	109.0 (4.29)	95.8 (3.77)	100.2 (3.94)	84.2 (3.31)	83.9 (3.30)	90.9 (3.58)	79.4 (3.13)	86.8 (3.42)	81.1 (3.19)	89.7 (3.53)	1,085.3 (42.72)
Average precipitation days	25.6	24.4	28.0	27.9	28.7	27.7	28.0	28.2	27.0	27.9	26.3	26.3	326
Average afternoon relative humidity (%)	83	84	84	86	86	85	87	85	84	81	82	82	84
Mean monthly sunshine hours	127.1	107.4	89.9	57.0	34.1	21.0	21.7	46.5	75.0	105.4	114.0	114.7	913.8
Source: Bureau of Meteorology

== Flora and fauna ==
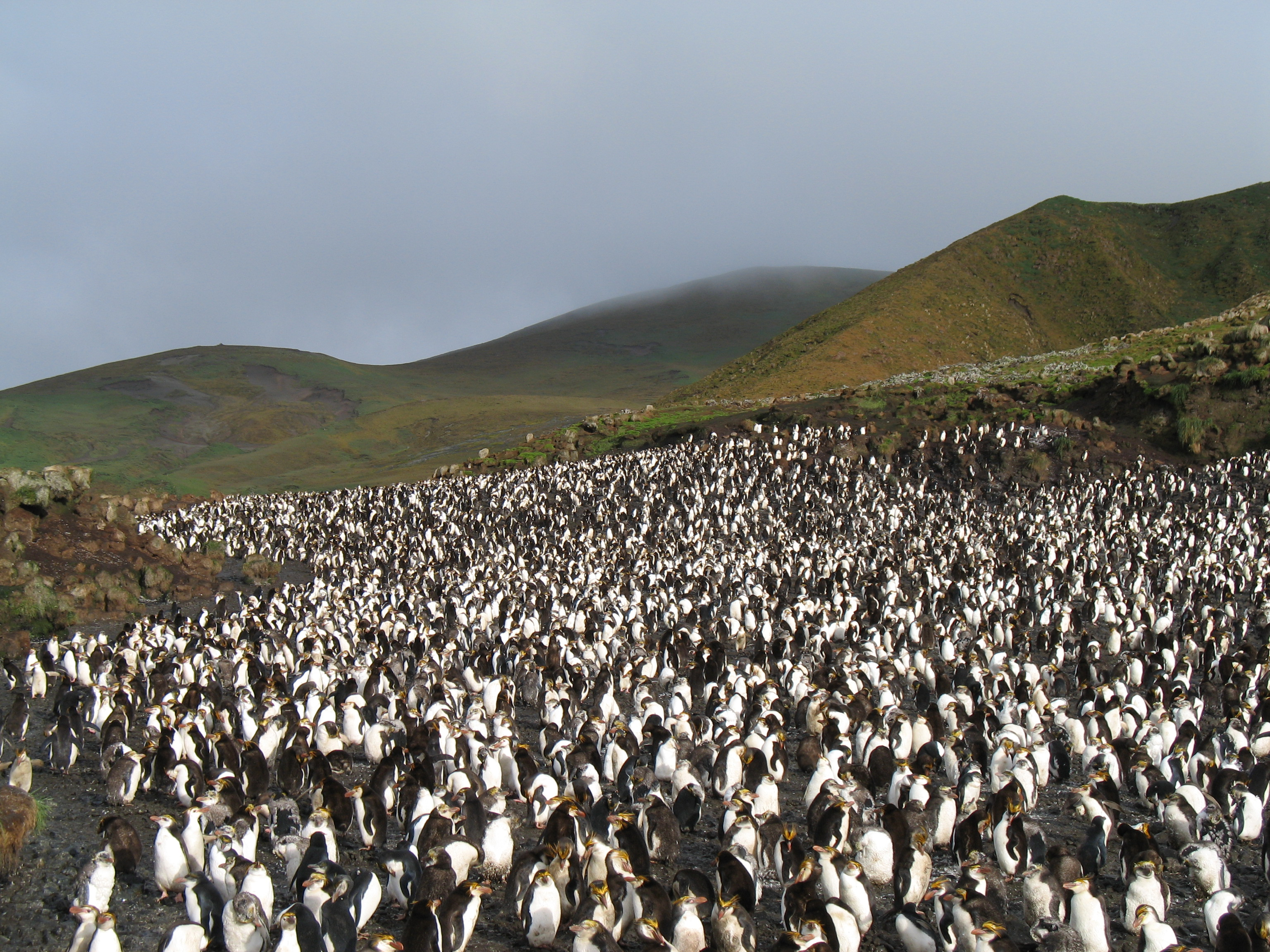
A royal penguin rookery on Macquarie Island.

The flora has taxonomic affinities with other subantarctic islands, especially those south of New Zealand. Plants rarely grow over 0.8 m (2.6 ft) in height, though the tussock-forming grass Poa foliosa can grow up to 1.5 m (4.9 ft) tall in sheltered areas. There are over 42 vascular plant species and 200 non-vascular plant species, including mosses, liverworts, and lichens. Woody plants are absent.

The island has five principal vegetation formations: grassland, herbfield, fen, bog and feldmark. Bog communities include 'featherbed', a deep and spongy peat bog vegetated by grasses and low herbs, with patches of free water. Endemic flora include the cushion plant Azorella macquariensis, the grass Puccinellia macquariensis, and two orchids – Corybas dienemus and Corybas sulcatus.

Mammals found on the island include subantarctic fur seals, Antarctic fur seals, New Zealand fur seals and southern elephant seals – over 80,000 individuals of this species. Diversities and distributions of cetaceans are less known; southern right whales and orcas are more common followed by other migratory baleen and toothed whales, especially sperm and beaked whales, which prefer deep waters. So-called "upland seals" once found on Antipodes Islands and Macquarie Island have been claimed by some researchers as a distinct subspecies of fur seals with thicker furs, although it is unclear whether these seals were genetically distinct.

Royal penguins and Macquarie shags are endemic breeders, while king penguins, western rockhopper penguins and gentoo penguins also breed here in large numbers. The island has been identified by BirdLife International as an Important Bird Area because it supports about 3.5 million breeding seabirds of 13 species.

== Human interaction ==
=== Protected area ===
The Tasmanian Government declared Macquarie Island as a wildlife sanctuary in 1933. The status was changed to a conservation area in 1971, and then in 1972 it was re-designated as a state reserve known as the Macquarie Island Wildlife Reserve. In 1977 the island was declared a Biosphere Reserve under the UNESCO Man and the Biosphere Programme, and it was also listed on the Australia Register of the National Estate. In 1978, the area of the state reserve was extended to the mean low-water mark including the offshore islets, and it was formally named as the Macquarie Island Nature Reserve. Access to the reserve was restricted from 1979 onwards, requiring a permit for all those seeking access to the reserve.

In December 1997, Macquarie Island was listed as UNESCO World Heritage Site, including the reserve and the surrounding waters out to 12 nautical miles. The Macquarie Island Marine Park was established in 1999, and in 2000, the Macquarie Island Nature Reserve was extended in 2000 to include the area out to 3 nautical miles from the island and outlying islets.

Ecotourism cruise vessels visit the island, but the number of visitors has been limited to 2,000 per annum.

=== Impact of introduced animals ===
The island ecology was affected by the onset of European visits in 1810. The island's fur seals, elephant seals and penguins were killed for fur and blubber. Rats and mice that were inadvertently introduced from the ships prospered due to lack of predators. Cats were subsequently introduced deliberately to keep the rats and mice from eating human food stores. In about 1870, rabbits and a species of New Zealand rail (wekas) were left on the island by sealers to breed for food. This caused huge damage to the local wildlife, including the extinction of the Macquarie rail (Gallirallus philippensis macquariensis), the Macquarie parakeet (Cyanoramphus novaezelandiae erythrotis), and an as-yet-undescribed species of teal. By the 1970s, 130,000 rabbits were causing tremendous damage to vegetation.

==== Feral cats ====
The feral cats introduced to the island had a devastating effect on the native seabird population, with an estimated annual loss of 60,000 seabirds. From 1985, efforts were undertaken to remove the cats. In June 2000, the last of the nearly 2,500 cats were culled in an effort to save the seabirds. Seabird populations responded rapidly, but rats and rabbits population increased after the cats were culled, and continued to cause widespread environmental damage.

==== Rabbits ====
The rabbits rapidly multiplied before numbers were reduced to about 10,000 in the early 1980s when myxomatosis was introduced. Rabbit numbers then grew again to over 100,000 by 2006. Rats and mice feeding on young chicks, and rabbits nibbling on the grass layer, has led to soil erosion and cliff collapses, destroying seabird nests. Large portions of the Macquarie Island bluffs are eroding as a result. In September 2006 a large landslip at Lusitania Bay, on the eastern side of the island, partially destroyed an important penguin breeding colony. Tasmania Parks and Wildlife Service attributed the landslip to a combination of heavy spring rains and severe erosion caused by rabbits.

Research by Australian Antarctic Division scientists, published in the 13 January 2009 issue of the British Ecological Society's Journal of Applied Ecology, suggested that the success of the feral cat eradication program has allowed the rabbit population to increase, damaging the Macquarie Island ecosystem by altering significant areas of island vegetation. However, in a comment published in the same journal other scientists argued that a number of factors (primarily a reduction in the use of the Myxoma virus) were almost certainly involved and the absence of cats may have been relatively minor among them. The original authors examined the issue in a later reply and concluded that the effect of the Myxoma virus use was small and reaffirmed their original position. The original authors did not, however, explain how rabbit numbers were greater in previous periods such as the 1970s before the myxoma virus was introduced and when cats were not being controlled, nor how rabbits had built up to such high numbers when cats were present for some 60 years prior to the introduction of rabbits; suggesting that cats were not controlling rabbit populations before the introduction of the myxoma virus.

==== Eradication of rabbits, rats and mice ====
On 4 June 2007, a media release by Malcolm Turnbull, Federal Minister for Australia's Environment and Water Resources Board, announced that the Australian and Tasmanian Governments had reached an agreement to jointly fund the eradication of rodent pests, including rabbits, to protect Macquarie Island's World Heritage values. The plan, estimated to cost A$24 million, was based on mass baiting the island similar to an eradication program on Campbell Island, New Zealand, to be followed with teams of dogs trained by Steve Austin over a maximum seven-year period. The baiting was expected to inadvertently affect kelp gulls, but greater-than-expected bird deaths caused the program to be suspended. Other species killed by the baits include giant petrels, black ducks and skuas.

In February 2012, The Australian newspaper reported that rabbits, rats and mice had been nearly eradicated from the island. In April 2012 the hunting teams reported the extermination of 13 rabbits that had survived the 2011 baiting; the last five were found in November 2011, including a lactating doe and four kittens. No fresh rabbit signs were found up to July 2013.

On 8 April 2014, Macquarie Island was officially declared pest-free, after seven years of conservation efforts. This achievement was the largest successful island pest-eradication program attempted to that date. In May 2024, it was reported that the island had remained free of pests for 10 years, with vegetation flourishing.

Populations of multiple bird species have begun to recover. Specifically, this resulted in a 21.2% decrease in the extinction risk for local bird species between 2010 and 2020. This local conservation success provided a slight counterbalance to broader national declines in Australian bird species survival during the same decade. The white-headed petrel (Pterodroma lessonii) that was close to extirpation by 2001 has shown a large increase in breeding success, and the population is now slowly increasing. Two other species of petrel, the grey petrel (Procellaria cinerea) and blue petrel (Halobaena caerulea) that were extinct on the main island from the 1900s, have now returned. Their populations are increasing at around 10% per annum. In 2024, giant petrels and skuas are returning to their numbers of before the baiting. However, ongoing monitoring, along with measures such as the use of biosecurity dogs to check cargo with the island as its destination are necessary, as there are new threats such as climate change and avian influenza. Ongoing monitoring programs are funded by the federal government.

=== Introduced birds ===
Despite being declared pest-free, Macquarie Island is still inhabited by several invasive bird species, such as the domestic mallard and European starling. The self-introduction of domestic mallards from New Zealand has become a threat to the Pacific black duck population on Macquarie Island through introgressive hybridisation.

=== Introduced invertebrates ===
At least 40 species of non-native invertebrates have established themselves on the island, the majority of them small detritivores. In addition, a number of larger‑bodied non‑native species occur, such as the milky slug Deroceras reticulatum, earthworms (Lumbricidae), the terrestrial amphipod Puhuruhuru patersoni and the isopod Styloniscus otakensis, and the predatory flatworms Kontikia andersoni and Arthurdendyus vegrandis.

== Governance and administration ==
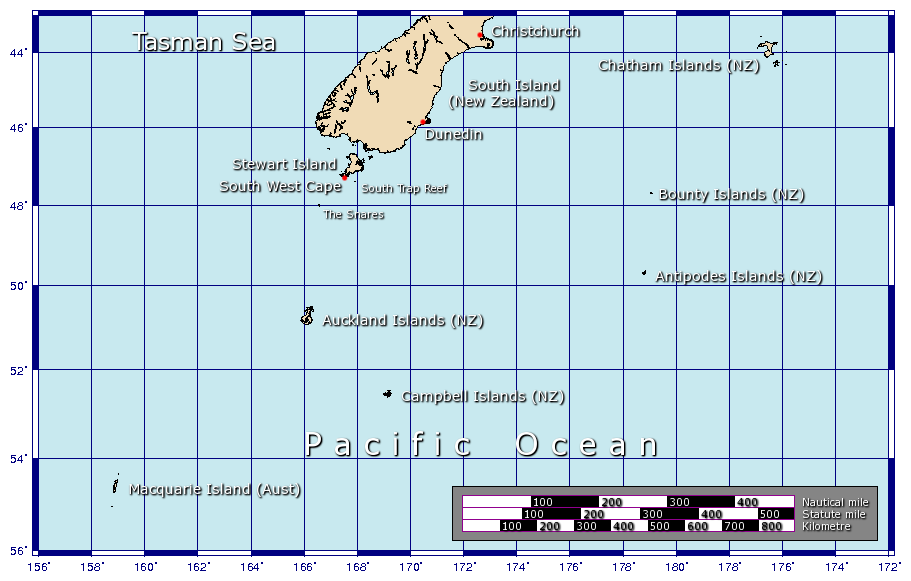
Map showing Macquarie Island's position relative to New Zealand's outlying territories.

Macquarie Island has been administered as part of the Australian State of Tasmania since 1880. It was a part of Esperance Municipality until 1993, when the municipality was merged with other municipalities to form Huon Valley Council.

Since 1948, the Australian Antarctic Division (AAD) has maintained a permanent base, the Macquarie Island Station, on the isthmus at the northern end of the island at the foot of Wireless Hill. The population of the base, constituting the island's only human inhabitants, usually varies from 20 to 40 people over the year. A heliport is located nearby.

In September 2016, the Australian Antarctic Division said it would close its research station on the island in 2017. However, shortly afterwards, the Australian government responded to widespread backlash by announcing funding to upgrade ageing infrastructure and continue existing operations.

In 2018, the Australian Antarctic Division published a map showing the island's buildings with confirmed or suspected asbestos contamination, which included at least half the structures there.

In April 2024, Permanent Daylight-Saving Time on Macquarie Island was abolished by the Huon Valley Council and was changed to Summer DST. Previously, Macquarie Island was the only place on earth to observe permanent Daylight-Saving Time. Permanent Daylight-Saving on Macquarie Island was intended for stationed personnel on Macquarie Island Station, but then consent for a permanent human population was granted.

Through "Operation Southern Discovery", elements of the Australian Defence Force also provide annual support for the Australian Antarctic Division and the Australian Antarctic Program (AAP) in regional scientific, environmental and economic activities. As part of "Operation Resolute", the Royal Australian Navy and Australian Border Force are tasked with deploying Cape or Armidale-class patrol boats to carry out civil maritime security operations in the region as may be required. In part to carry out this mission, as of 2023, the Navy's Armidale-class boats are in the process of being replaced by larger Arafura-class offshore patrol vessels.

== Gallery ==
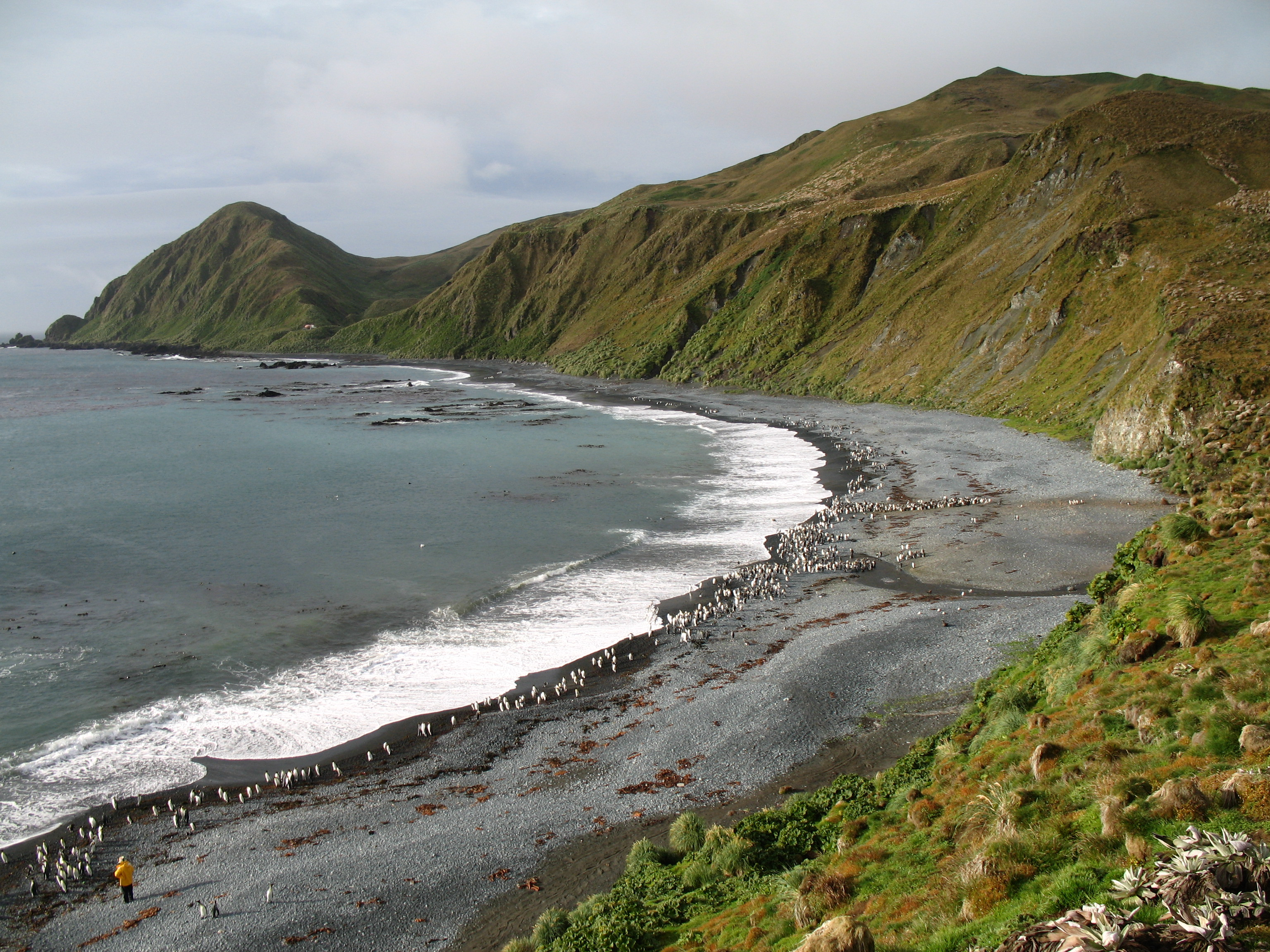
A Macquarie Island beach

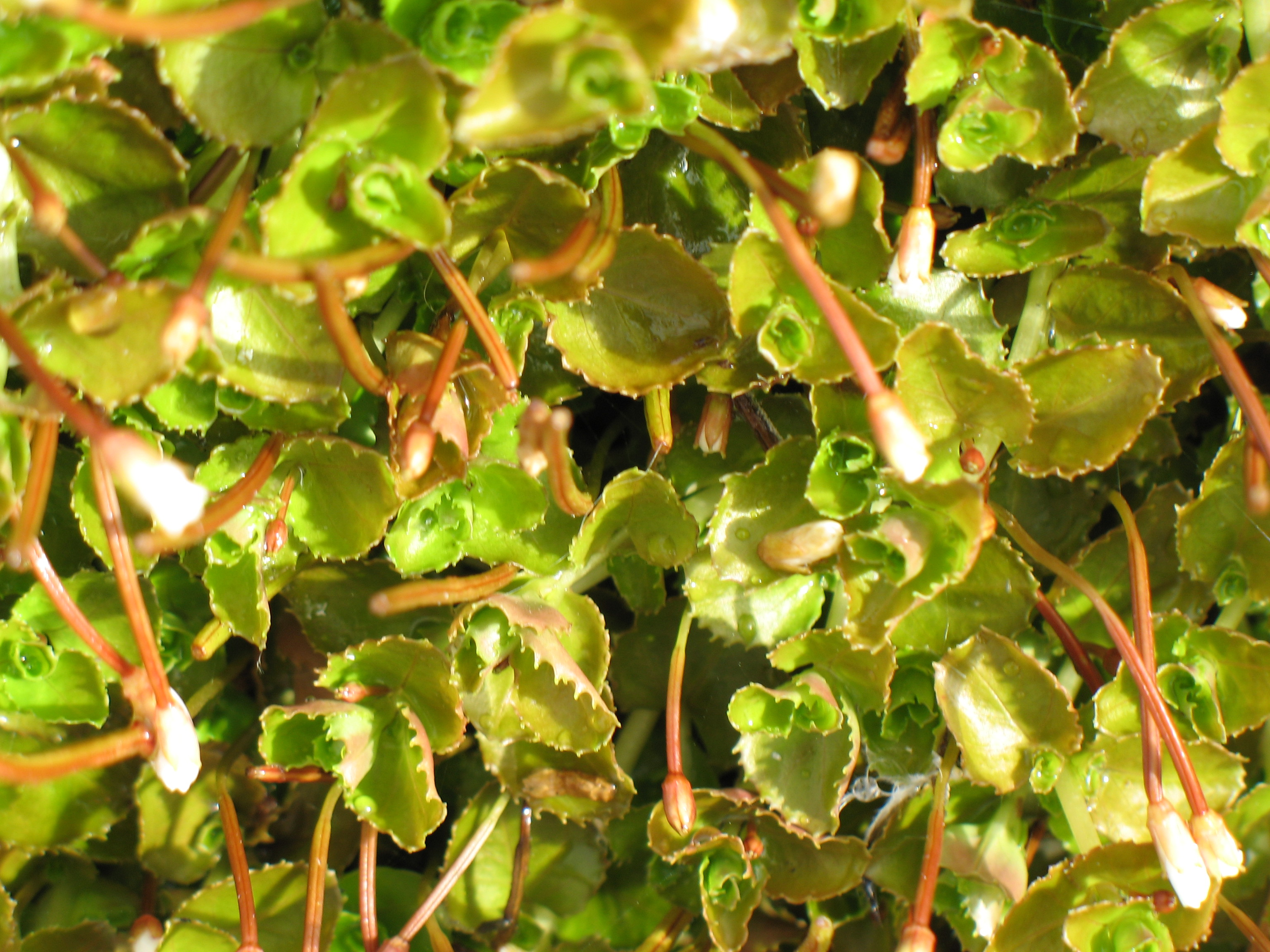
Macquarie Island flora, Epilobium pedunculare

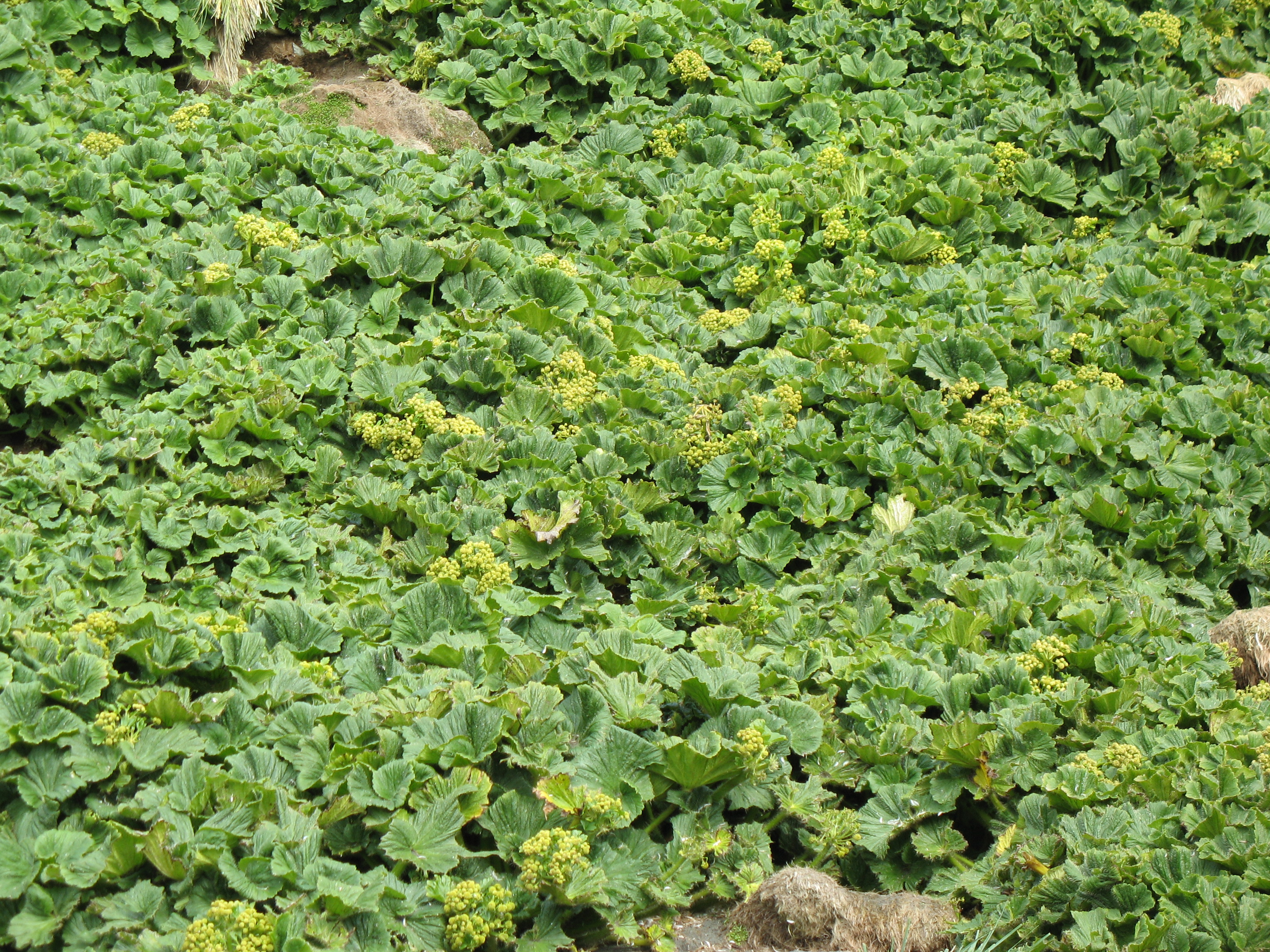
Macquarie Island flora, Azorella polaris

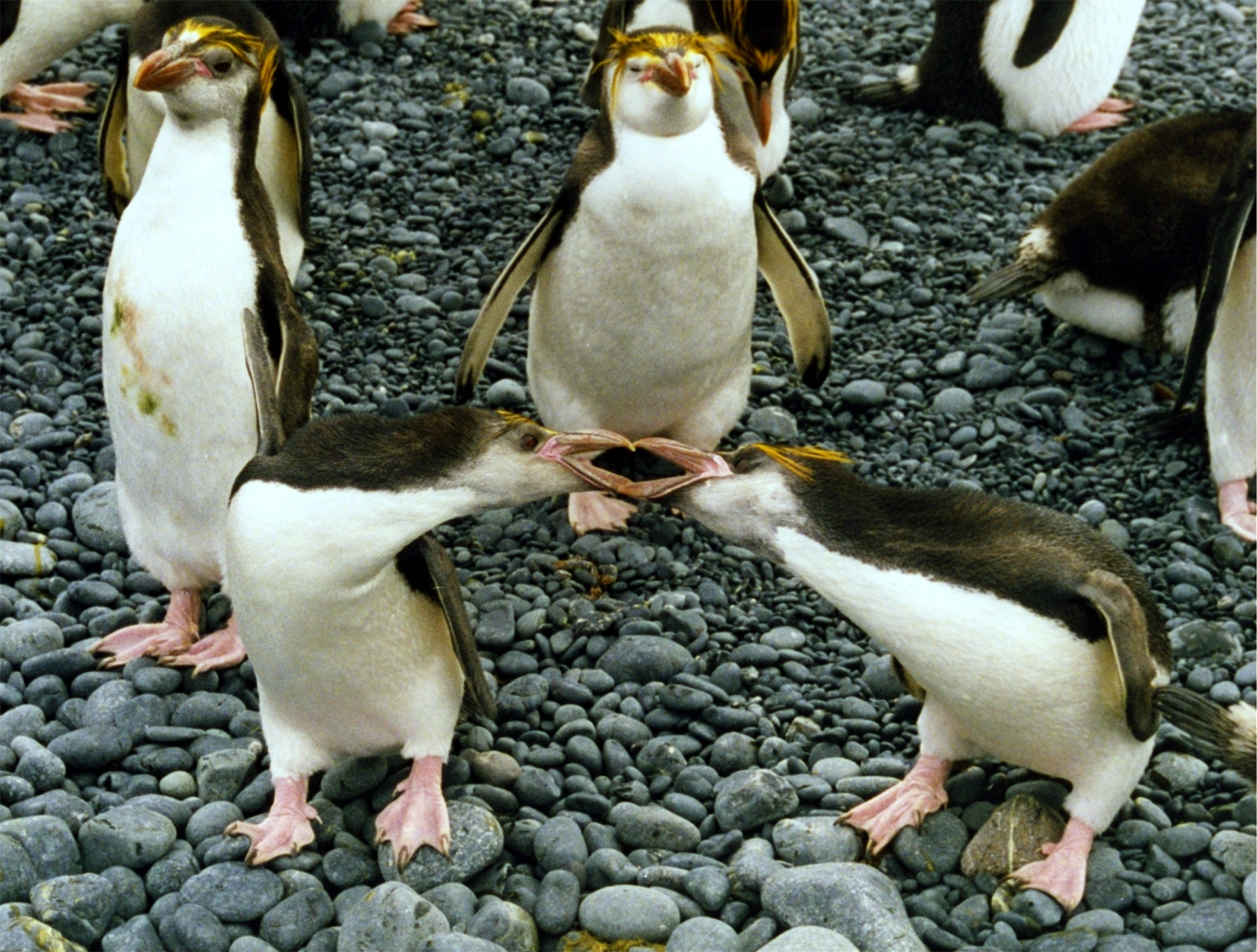
Royal penguins

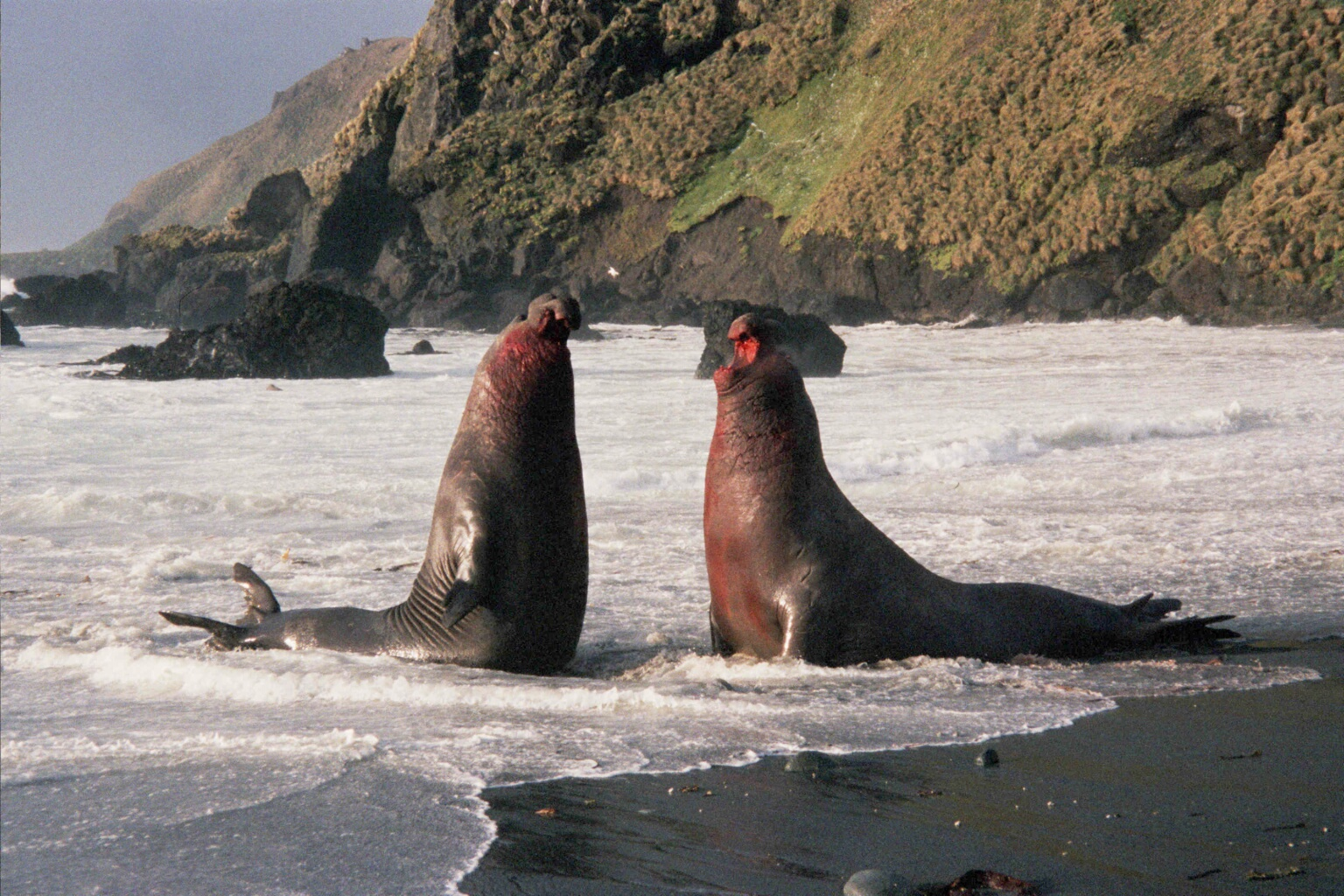
Bull elephant seals fighting

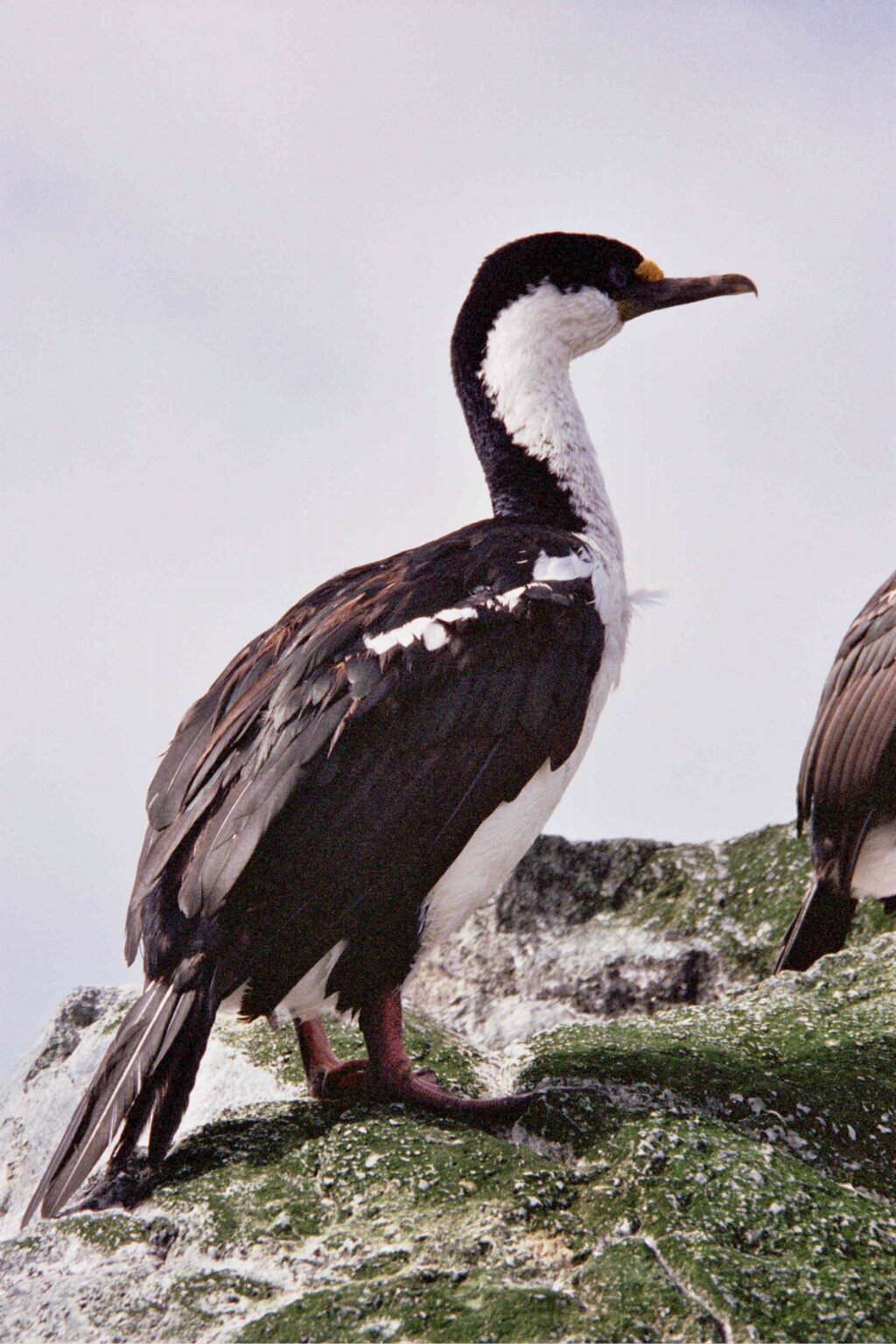
Macquarie shag

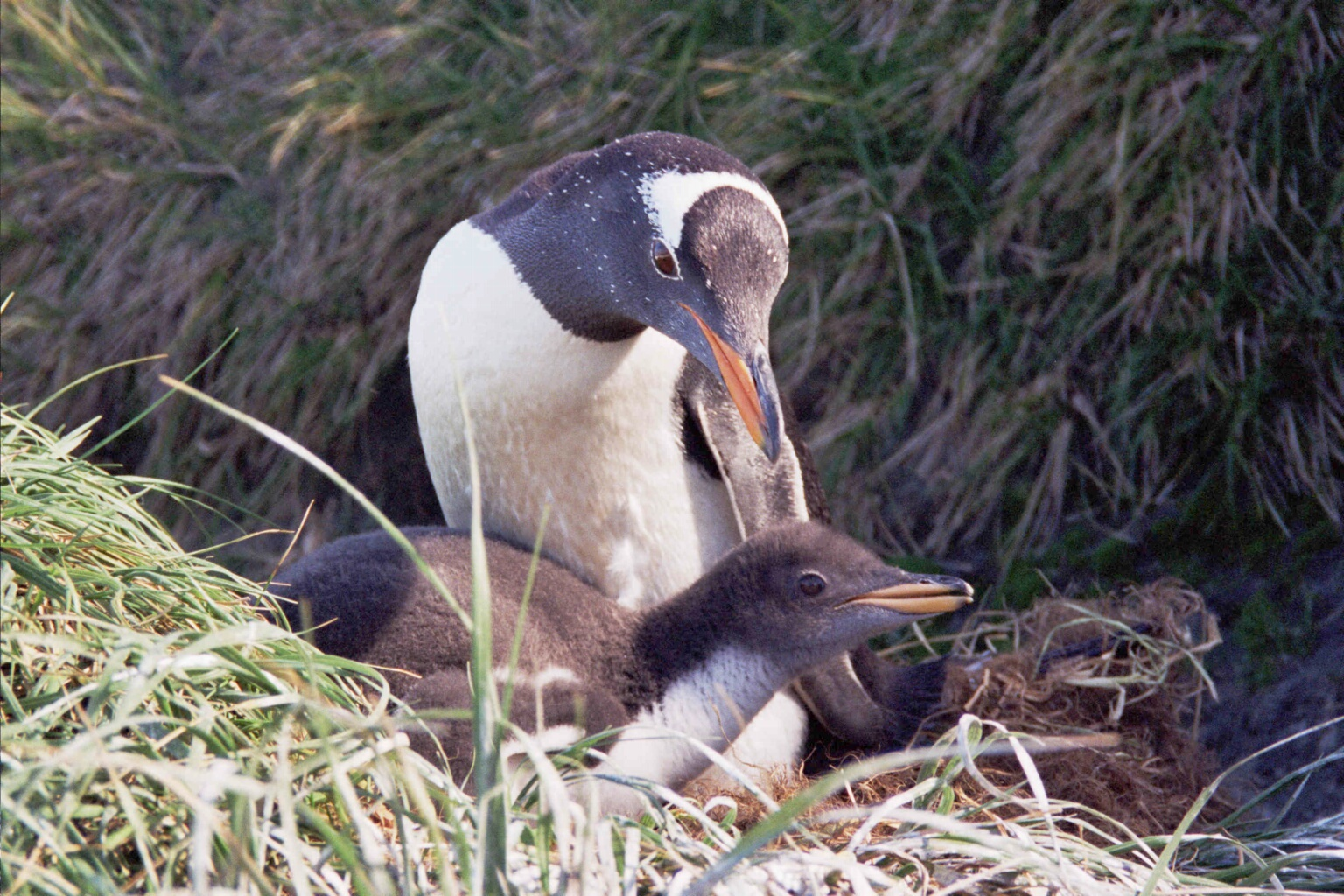
Gentoo penguin with chick

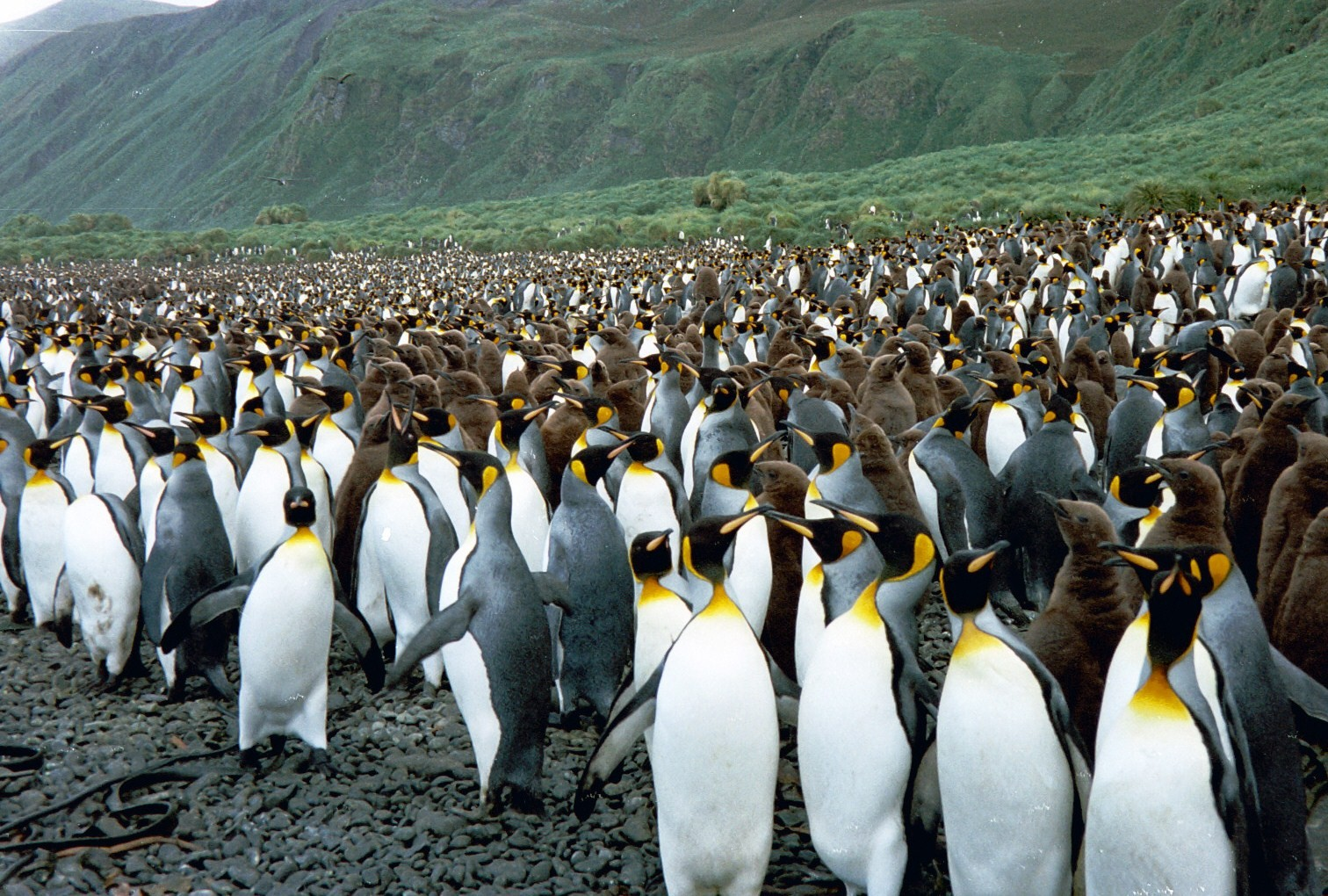
King penguins at Lusitania Bay

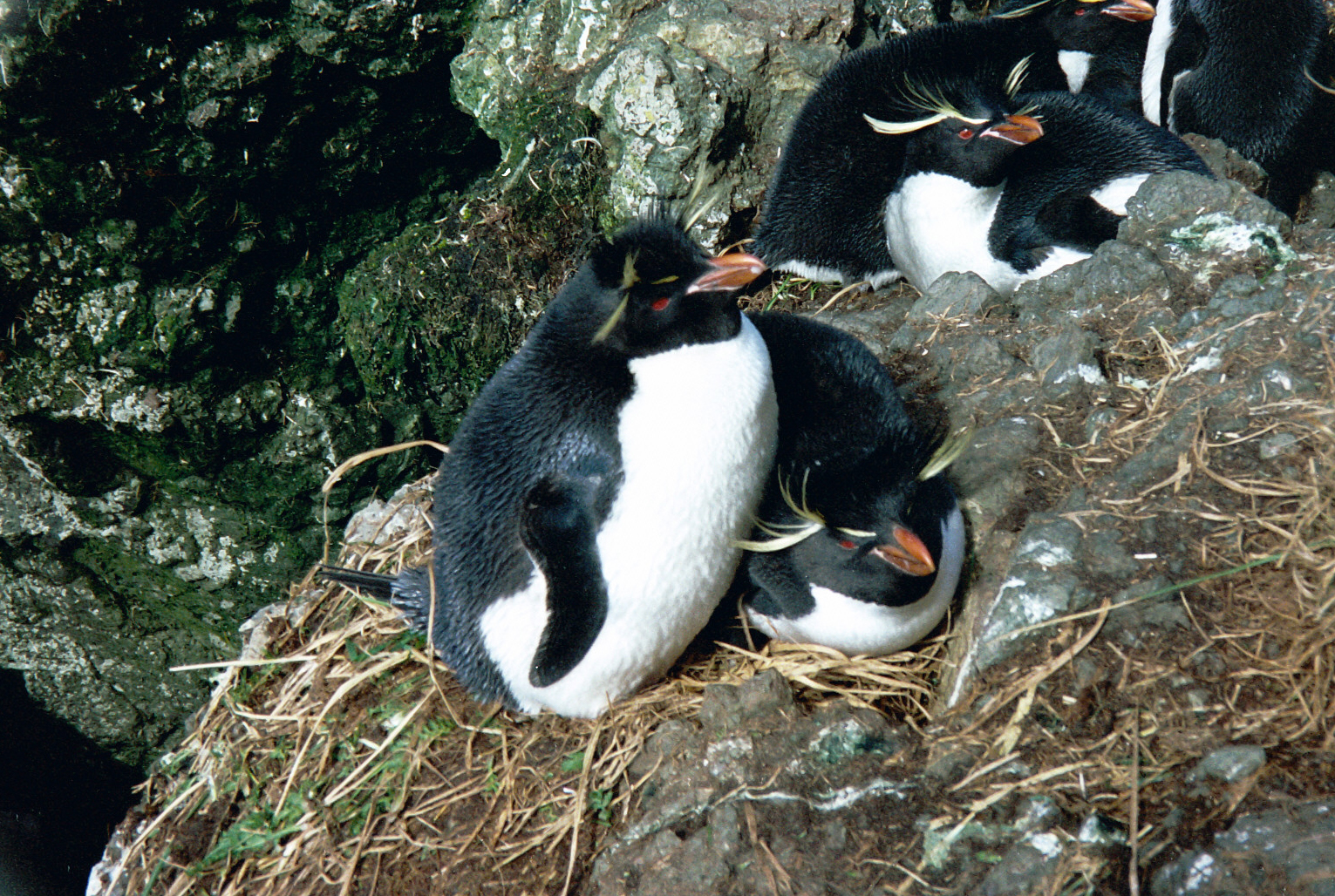
Eastern rockhopper penguins

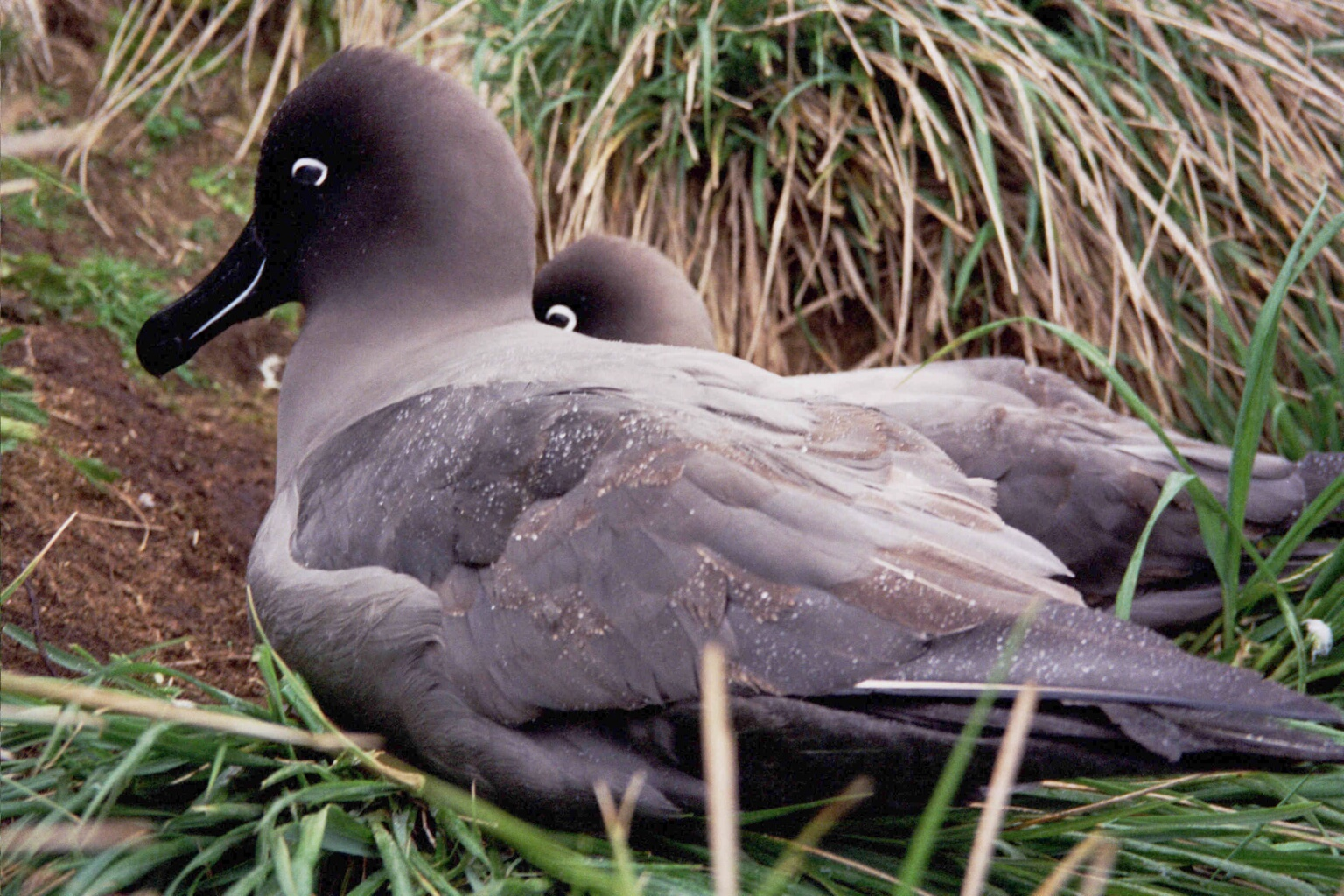
Sooty albatross

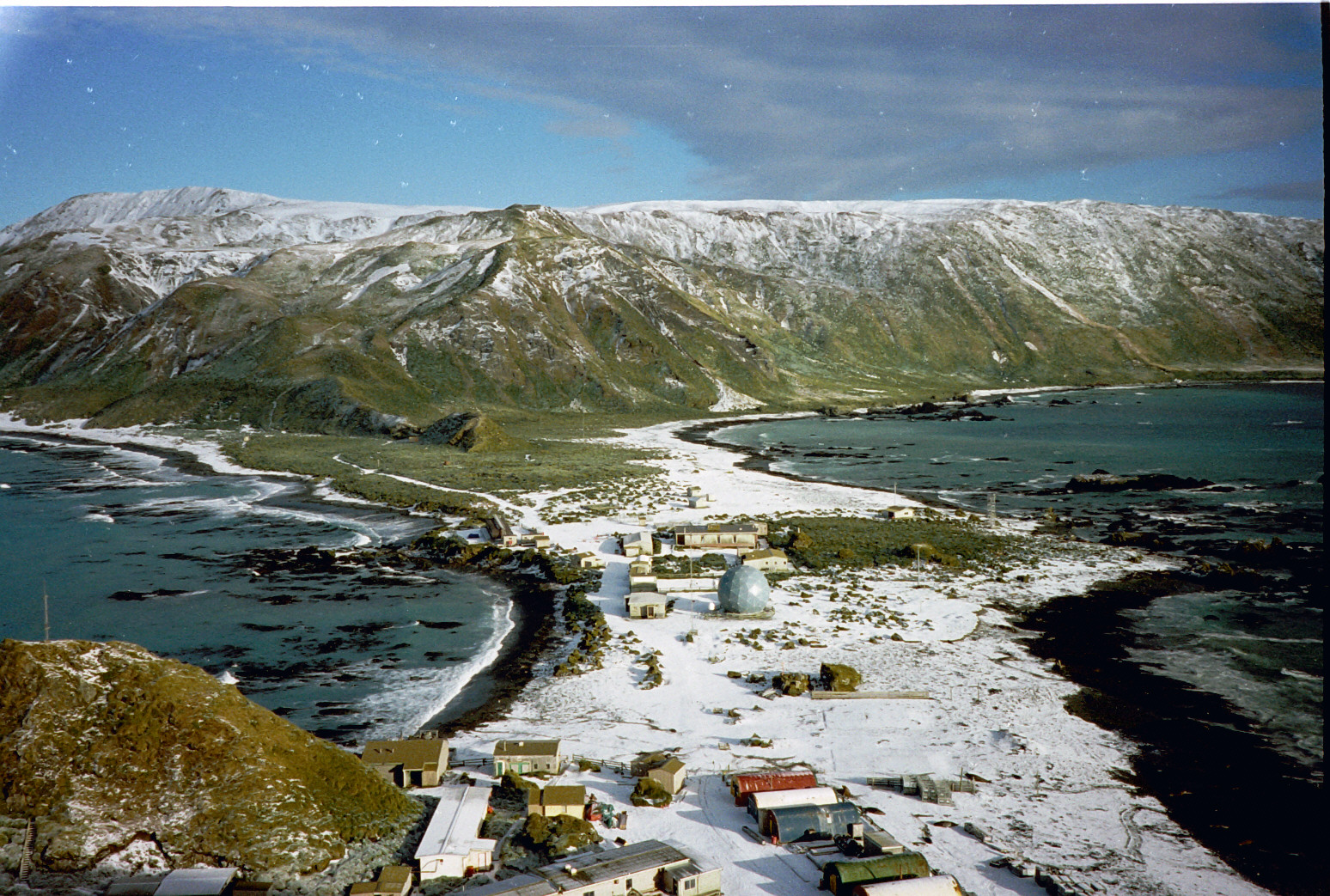
Macquarie Island Station

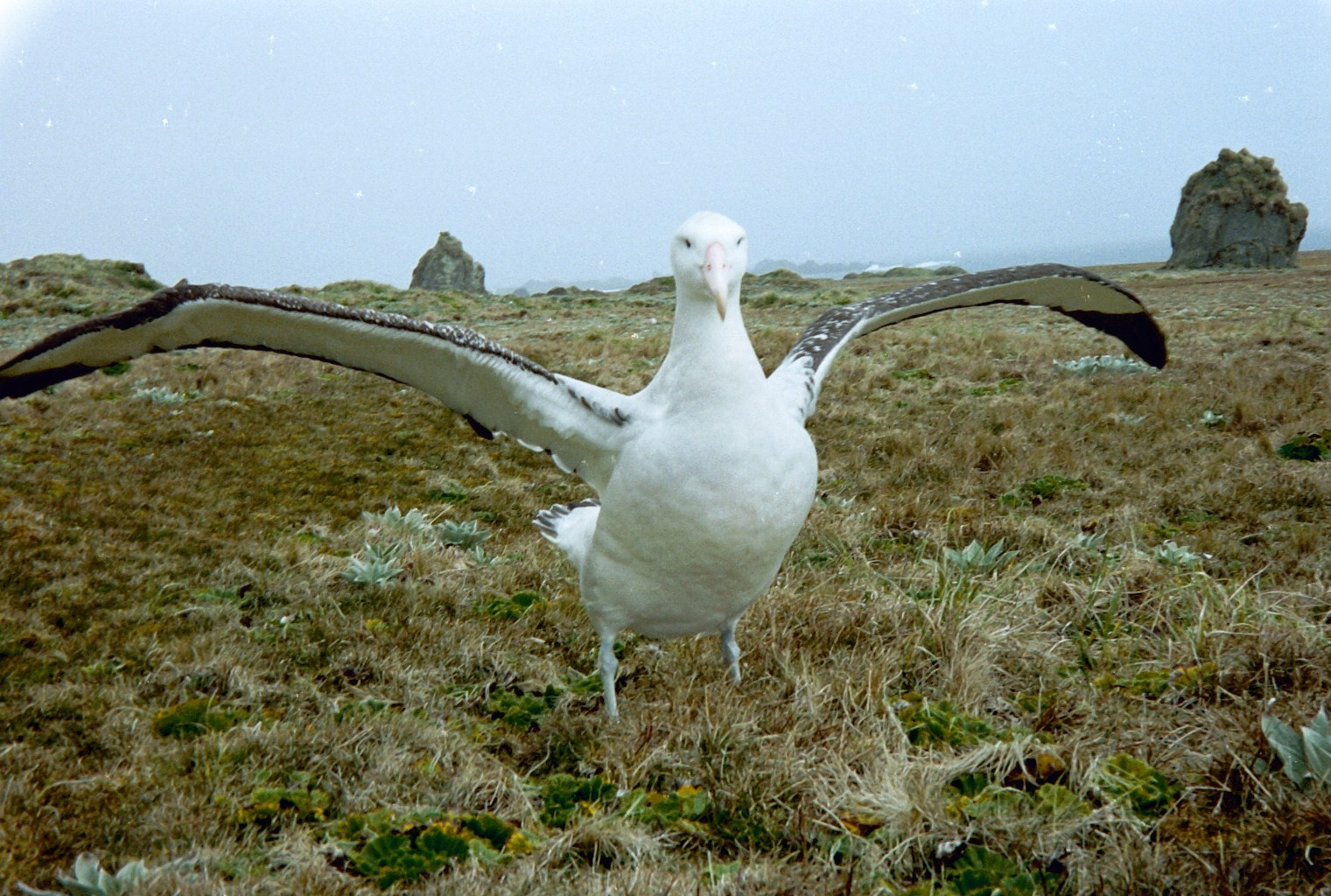
Snowy albatross

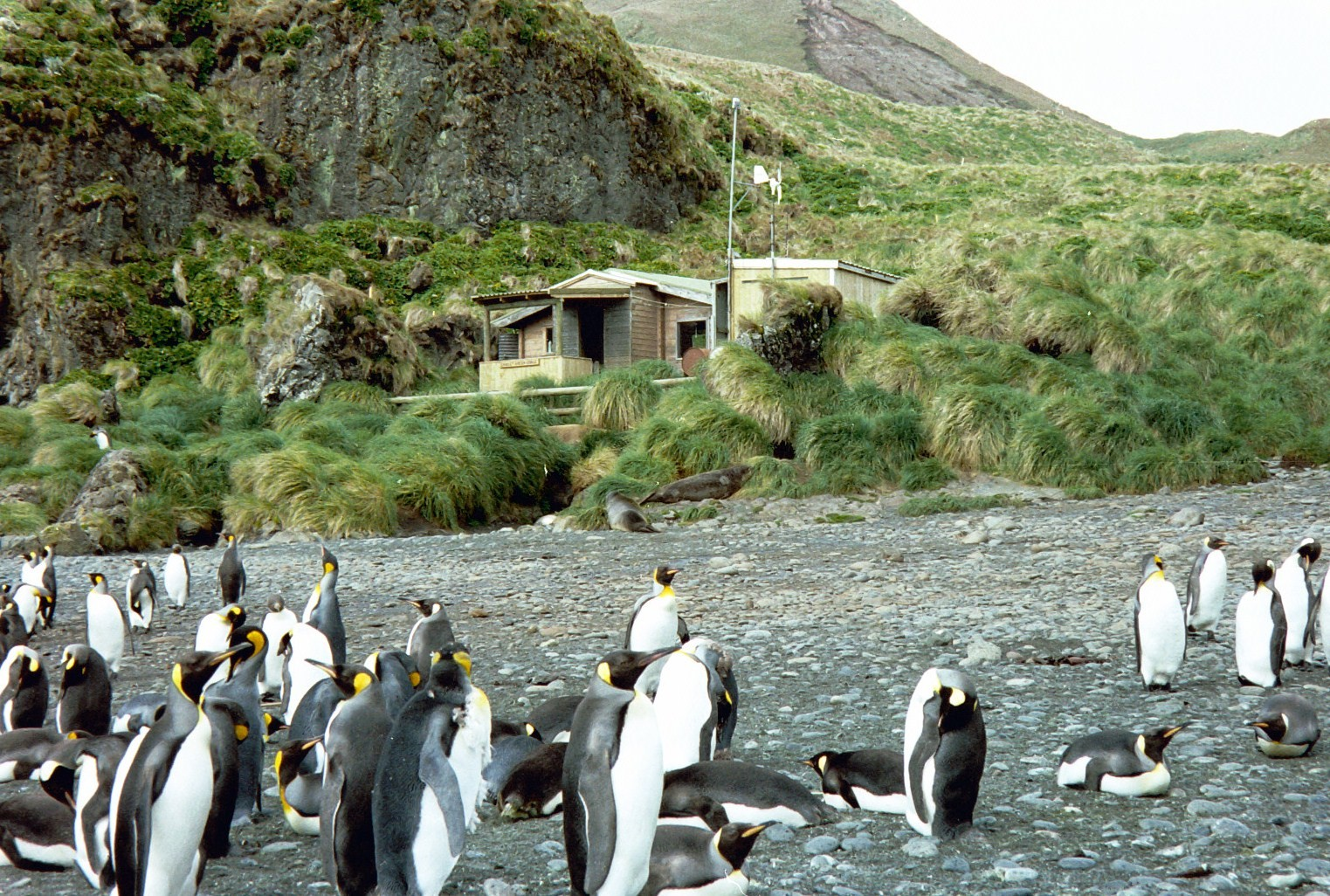
Green Gorge hut and king penguins

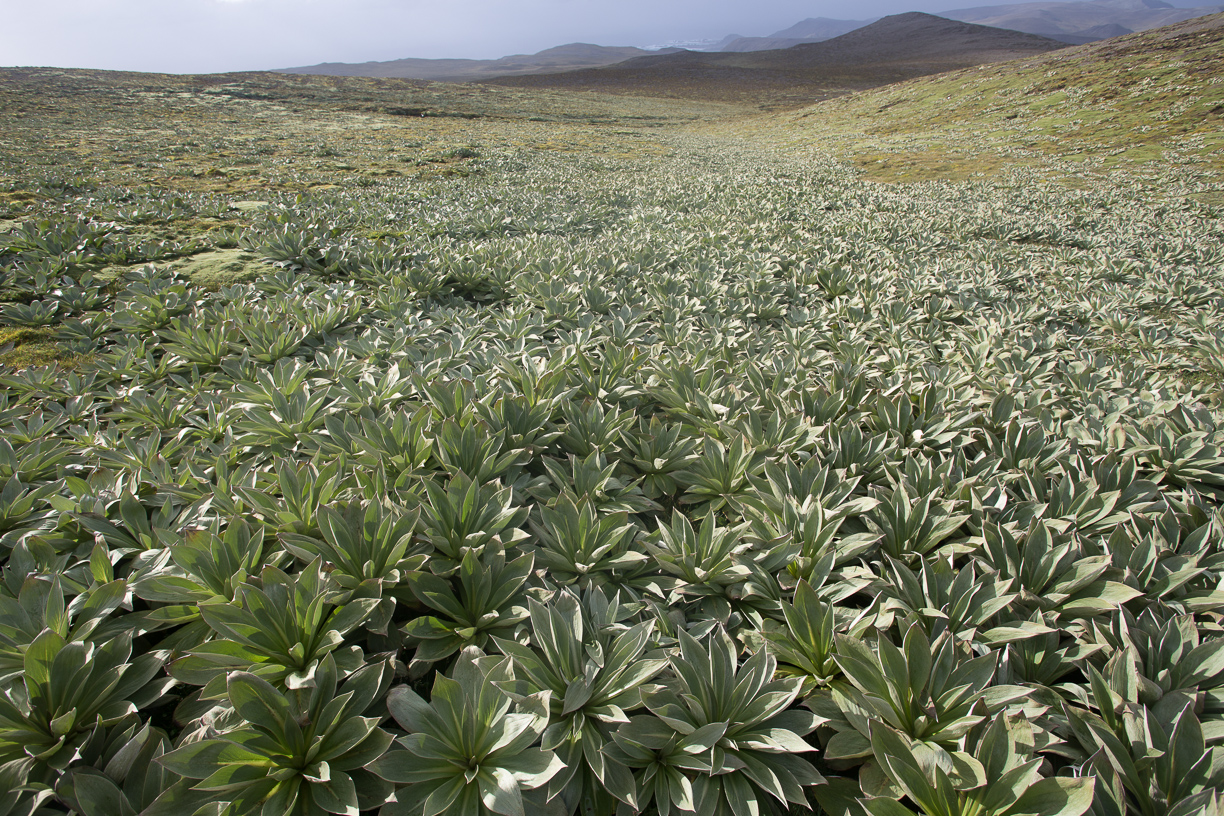
Highland herbfield dominated by Pleurophyllum hookeri

=== Wildlife sounds ===
King penguin rookery at Lusitania Bay

Male elephant seal vocalising

Royal penguin rookery at Hurd Point

Problems listening to the files? See Wikipedia media help.

== See also ==
- Campbell Macquarie (1812 shipwreck)
- Emerald Island (phantom), phantom island said to lie south of Macquarie Island.
- Island restoration
- List of administrative heads of Macquarie Island
- List of Antarctic and subantarctic islands
- List of islands of Tasmania
- Macquarie Fault Zone
- Macquarie Island Marine Park
- New Zealand Subantarctic Islands, which fall into the same bioregion and are its nearest neighbours.

== Sources ==
- Selkirk, Patricia; Seppelt, Rodney David; Selkirk, D. R. (1990). Subantarctic Macquarie Island: Environment and Biology. Studies in Polar Research. Cambridge: Cambridge University Press. ISBN 978-0-521-26633-8.
- Raymond, Ben; McInnes, Julie; Dambacher, Jeffrey M.; Way, Sarah; Bergstrom, Dana M. (2011). "Qualitative Modelling of Invasive Species Eradication on Subantarctic Macquarie Island". Journal of Applied Ecology. 48 (1): 181–191. Bibcode:2011JApEc..48..181R. doi:10.1111/j.1365-2664.2010.01916.x.
- Jenkin, J. F. (1975). "Macquarie Island, Subantarctic". Ecological Bulletins (20): 375–397. JSTOR 45331786.
- Copson, Geof; Whinam, Jennie (2001). "Review of Ecological Restoration Programme on Subantarctic Macquarie Island: Pest Management Progress and Future Directions". Ecological Management & Restoration. 2 (2): 129–138. Bibcode:2001EcoMR...2..129C. doi:10.1046/j.1442-8903.2001.00076.x.
- Williamson, P. E. (1988). "Origin, Structural and Tectonic History of the Macquarie Island Region". Papers and Proceedings of The Royal Society of Tasmania. 122 (1): 27–43. doi:10.26749/rstpp.122.1.27.
- Streten, N. A. (1988). "The Climate of Macquarie Island and its Role in Atmospheric Monitoring". Papers and Proceedings of The Royal Society of Tasmania. 122 (1): 91–106. doi:10.26749/rstpp.122.1.91.
- Varne, R.; Rubenach, M. J. (1972). Hayes, E. (ed.). Geology of Macquarie Island and its Relationship to Oceanic Crust. Antarctic Research Series. Vol. 19. Washington, D. C.: American Geophysical Union. pp. 251–266. doi:10.1029/ar019p0251. ISBN 978-0-87590-119-0.
- Lugg, D. J.; Johnstone, G. W.; Griffin, B. J. (1978). "The Outlying Islands of Macquarie Island". The Geographical Journal. 144 (2): 277–287. Bibcode:1978GeogJ.144..277L. doi:10.2307/634145. JSTOR 634145.
- Brothers, N.; Copson, G. R. (1988). "Macquarie Island Flora and Fauna Management: Interpreting Progress and Predictions for the Future". Papers and Proceedings of The Royal Society of Tasmania. 122 (2): 129–135. doi:10.26749/rstpp.122.1.129.
- Springer, Keith (2018). "Eradication of Invasive Species on Macquarie Island to Restore the Natural Ecosystem". In Garnett, Stephen; Latch, Peter; Lindenmayer, David; Woinarski, John (eds.). Recovering Australian Threatened Species. CSIRO Publishing. pp. 13–22. doi:10.1071/9781486307425.bk07705_ch03. ISBN 978-1-4863-0741-8.
- Adams, N. (2009). "Climate Trends at Macquarie Island and Expectations of Future Climate Change in the Sub-Antarctic". Papers and Proceedings of the Royal Society of Tasmania. 143 (1): 1–8. doi:10.26749/rstpp.143.1.1.
- Kriwoken, Lorne K.; Ellis, Claire; Holmes, Nick (2006). "Macquarie Island, Australia". In Baldacchino, Godfrey (ed.). Extreme Tourism: Lessons from the World's Cold Water Islands (1 ed.). Routledge. pp. 193–203. doi:10.4324/9780080458779-18. ISBN 978-0-08-045877-9.
- Löffler, Ernst (1984). "Macquarie Island: A Wind-Molded Natural Landscape in the Subantarctic". Polar Geography and Geology. 8 (4): 267–286. doi:10.1080/10889378409377228.
- Sindel, Brian M.; Kristiansen, Paul E.; Wilson, Susan C.; Shaw, Justine D.; Williams, Laura K. (29 January 2018). "Managing Invasive Plants on Sub-Antarctic Macquarie Island". The Rangeland Journal. 39 (6): 537–549. doi:10.1071/RJ17073.
- Williamson, P. (1974). "Recent Studies of Macquarie Island and the Macquarie Ridge Complex". Exploration Geophysics. 5 (1): 19–22. doi:10.1071/EG974019.
- Varne, Rick; Brown, Anthony V.; Falloon, Trevor (2000). "Macquarie Island: Its Geology, Structural History, and the Timing and Tectonic Setting of its N-MORB to E-MORB Magmatism". Ophiolites and Oceanic Crust: New Insights from Field Studies and the Ocean Drilling Program. Geological Society of America. doi:10.1130/0-8137-2349-3.301. ISBN 978-0-8137-2349-5.
- Parks and Wildlife Service (2006). "Macquarie Island Nature Reserve and World Heritage Area Management Plan 2006" (PDF). Parks and Wildlife Service, Department of Tourism, Arts and the Environment.
