= Macquarie Island Station =

- Subantarctic base
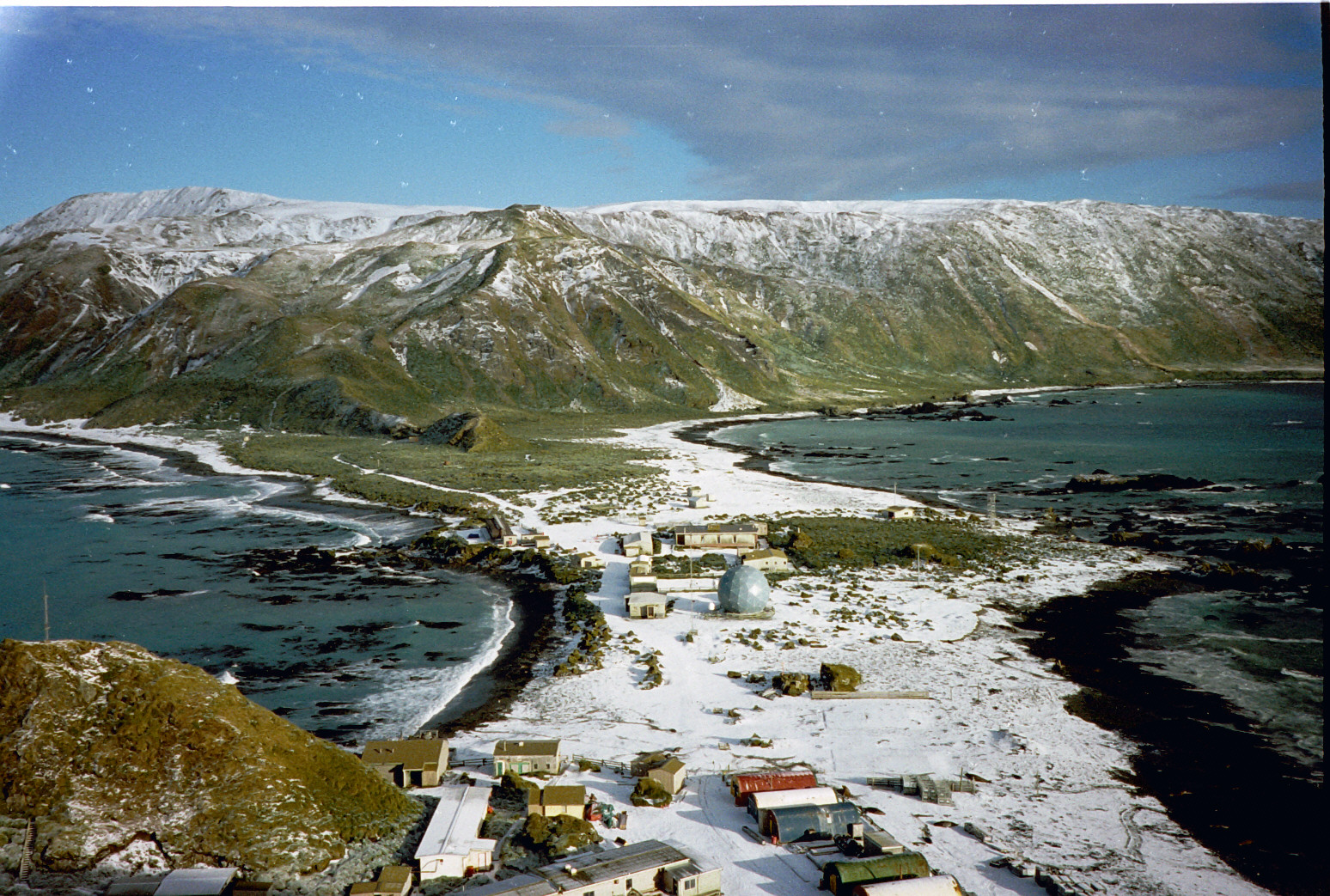
- Macquarie Island Isthmus, looking south from the summit of Wireless Hill, overlooking the research station
- Nickname: Macca
- Location of Macquarie Island Station, relative to Australia and New Zealand
- Coordinates: 54°29′56″S 158°56′20″E
- Country: Australia
- State: Tasmania
- LGA: Huon Valley Council
- Administered by: Australian Antarctic Division
- Established: 1911
- Named for: Lachlan Macquarie

Population
  - Summer: 40
  - Winter: 16
- Time zone: UTC+10:00 (AEST)
  - Summer (DST): UTC+11:00 (AEDT)
- UN/LOCODE: AU MQI
- Active times: All year-round
- Status: Operational
- Activities: List: Meteorology; Biology
- Facilities: List: Accommodation; Communal mess; Doctor's surgery; Stores; Workshops; Communications; Power generation facilities; Research and scientific buildings (geophysics, biology, upper atmosphere physics and meteorology; 30 separate buildings
- Website: antarctica.gov.au

The Macquarie Island Station, commonly called Macca, is a permanent Australian subantarctic research base on Macquarie Island, situated in the Southern Ocean and located approximately halfway between Mainland Australia and Antarctica, managed by the Australian Antarctic Division (AAD). The station lies at the base of Wireless Hill, between two bays on the isthmus at the northern end of the island.

The island and its surrounding waters are administered as a nature reserve by the Tasmania Parks and Wildlife Service. In 1997, the island was inscribed on the UNESCO World Heritage List as a site of major geoconservation significance, being the only place on Earth where rocks from the Earth's mantle are actively exposed above sea-level.

== Purpose ==
The research station is operated by the Australian Antarctic Division. Scientific research on the island is focused around biology, geosciences, meteorology, and human impact on the environment. Macquarie island birds breed on the island so wildlife management and counting is key to a number of research projects. Monitoring is also undertaken for the Australian Radiation Protection and Nuclear Safety Agency to detect radioactive debris from atmospheric explosions or vented by underground or underwater nuclear explosions. Macquarie Island is an important global monitoring location for scientific research, including monitoring southern hemisphere climatic data by Geoscience Australia.

=== Facilities ===
Various buildings exist, some dating back to the early 1950s: Sleeping quarters are in Southern Aurora Dongas (SAD), Garden Cove (Dorm), Hasselborough House and Cumpston's Cottage. A combined mess and kitchen adjoin the doctor's surgery. Storage exists in the main store shed and a large field store shed. The various trades there have their own workshops. A main and standby powerhouse provide electricity and reticulated heating water via a heat exchanger on the diesel generators. Water is sourced from a dam at the top of Gadget's Gully and piped to storage tanks at the station. Sewage is treated before discharge and garbage is sorted for recycling (back in Hobart) or incineration on site. Scientific facilities exist in the Biology Building, Physics Building and Bureau of Meteorology buildings. Various outbuildings support instrumentation such as ionosondes, seismometers and upper atmospheric experiments. A tide gauge is installed in Garden Cove.

=== Communications ===
The radiocommunications station has callsign "VJM" and conducts a nightly HF radio schedule with the field huts on 3023 kHz (time varies depending on season and staff preferences). Communications with Australia are conducted using the ANARESAT Earth station facility which utilises the Intelsat Pacific Ocean satellite. Inmarsat and Iridium Communications portable units are used as a backup. A network of VHF radio repeaters is utilised with handheld transceivers by bushwalkers on the island. The base has an Internet Protocol network for local PC and VoIP equipment.

== History ==
The station was opened in 1911 by Douglas Mawson as his party established a base to relay radio messages from Antarctica to Hobart, Tasmania. From 1948 the Australian National Antarctic Research Expeditions used the base for scientific purposes. Permanent Daylight-Saving Time was established for stationed personnel in 1948, which was later changed to Summer DST in April 2024 with the addition of a permanent human population on Macquarie Island.

In 2016 the government planned to close the station on Macquarie Island due to costs and safety issues but this decision was reversed. In 2021 the government provided $50 million to renovate the station. In 2024 the government offered $371 million to build a new facility.

The Russell Review investigated claims of sexual harassment and bullying in 2023 with a further release in 2026.

In August 2026, the Australian Antarctic Division announced that they would be withdrawing all personnel from the station, because the expected arrival of the H5N1 bird flu virus was forecast to lead to mass mortality in the colony of 2,500 elephant seals adjacent to the base. The withdrawal of 24 personnel from Macquarie Island was to avoid the predicted psychological effects of living for an extended period within a mass mortality event. The planned rebuild of the Macquarie station would be delayed.

Concerns regarding H5N1 on Macquarie Island are linked to a preprint publication, which used drones to look at southern elephant seals on another subantartic island, Heard Island. The study on Heard Island did not involve necropsies to assess cause of death. It is normal for 34.4% of seal pups to die in the first year.

== See also ==
- Amateur radio call signs of Antarctica
- Research stations in Antarctica § List of research stations
- Antarctic field camps
