= Wireless Hill =

Large landmass on Macquarie Island, Australia

Coordinates: 54°29′37″S 158°56′28″E

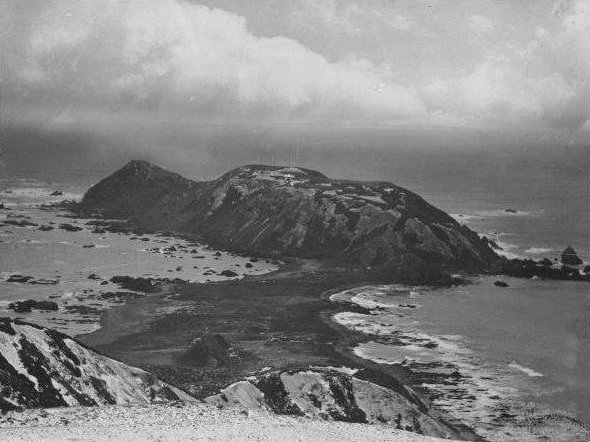
North Head with Wireless Hill and the Isthmus from the south, c.1912-1914

Wireless Hill is a steep-sided hill with a summit plateau that takes up most of the North Head promontory at the northern end of Australia’s subantarctic Macquarie Island, lying in the Southern Ocean about halfway between Australia and Antarctica. Its highest point is about 100 m above sea level and it is joined to the main body of the island by a low and narrow isthmus that is occasionally wave-washed in heavy storms. Macquarie Island Station, operated by the Australian Antarctic Division and the only permanently populated place on the island, lies at the northern end of the isthmus at the foot of Wireless Hill. The hill is so named because it was the site of an early wireless telegraphy relay station, part of the first radio link to Antarctica.

== Wireless Hill radio station ==
Headed by meteorologist George Ainsworth, the radio station was established as part of the 1911-1914 Australasian Antarctic Expedition led by Douglas Mawson in order to provide a radio link between the expedition’s main Antarctic base at Cape Denison, Commonwealth Bay, and Hobart, Tasmania. It comprised a radio shack, an engine room and transmission masts erected at the top of the hill. The equipment used was German-made Telefunken 1.5 kW spark transmitters, with power for radio transmission coming from a De Dion-Bouton engine.

The expedition telegraphists on Macquarie Island, Arthur Sawyer and Charles Sandell, used morse code operated on high frequency. The first transmission of the station was made to another receiver on the island on 17 January 1912. The first communication between the island and the outside world took place on 13 February 1912, with Sydney radio and with shipping. The station subsequently sent daily weather reports to Wellington, New Zealand. Communication with Commonwealth Bay was finally established in April 1913. In 1913 control of the station was handed over to the Australian Meteorological Service, which continued to operate it until 1915 when meteorological observations were discontinued. The site and the equipment were then abandoned until 1948 when the Australian National Antarctic Research Expeditions established a permanent presence on the island.
