= George Ainsworth =

19th and 20th-century Australian meteorologist and businessman

George Frederick Ainsworth (20 June 1878 – 11 October 1950) was an Australian meteorologist, public servant and businessman who headed one of the component parts of the Australasian Antarctic expedition of 1911–1914.

== Early years ==
Ainsworth was born in Lambton, New South Wales. At the age of 15 he joined the Department of Public Instruction as an assistant teacher, but transferred to the Meteorological Branch of the Department of Home Affairs in the Australian Public Service in 1910. He was then seconded to Mawson's Antarctic Expedition in the course of which he was in charge of the subantarctic Macquarie Island party for nearly two years – from December 1911 to November 1913. His responsibilities on Macquarie included the establishment of a weather station, as well as a radio relay station on Wireless Hill which pioneered the first radio communications between Antarctica and the outside world.

== Public servant ==
In 1915, Ainsworth was commissioned in the Australian 62nd Infantry Battalion. In 1917 he joined the Counter Espionage Bureau and was made an honorary captain. In the same year he married Mary Catherine Statham at Murwillumbah. Following demobilisation in 1918 he became an inspector in the Commonwealth Police in Queensland. Transferring to the Prime Minister's Department in 1921, he served as foreign-affairs officer with the Australian delegation to the 1923 Imperial Conference in London, as well as being the sole Australian delegate attending the International Labour Organization meeting at Geneva the same year.

== Businessman ==
Ainsworth's rapid rise as a public servant was at least partly as a protégé of Billy Hughes, who was Prime Minister of Australia from 1915 to 1923, and whom he greatly admired. He resigned from the public service at the end of 1924 to enter the private sector as a business manager, first with the Melbourne-based motor-parts company Kellow-Falkiner, then as general manager with the Chrysler Corporation in New Zealand, and finally as general manager with Barnet Glass Rubber in Queensland, from which he resigned in 1935. He subsequently became State organiser for the United Australia Party, of which Billy Hughes was one of the founders.

After incurring considerable financial losses through gambling on horse races, Ainsworth moved to Sydney in about 1937. There he lived in Vaucluse, New South Wales, ran a delicatessen in Leichhardt, and gave radio talks about his Antarctic experiences. During the Second World War he was briefly employed in meteorology again.

== Death ==
Ainsworth died in Sydney's Royal Prince Alfred Hospital of pyelonephritis and uraemia. He was survived by his wife and a daughter; a son had predeceased him. He died intestate with his estate having a probate value of £2450.
