= Macquarie Island Marine Park =

Australian Marine Park near Macquarie Island in the southwest Pacific

- IUCN category IV (habitat/species management area)
- Map showing the Macquarie Island Marine Park. The shaded area is a Sanctuary Zone ('no take' zone).
- Location: Australia
- Coordinates: 56.187°S 161.640°E
- Area: 475,465 km^{2} (183,578 sq mi)
- Established: 20 October 1999
- Operator: Parks Australia
- Website: https://parksaustralia.gov.au/marine/parks/south-east

The Macquarie Island Marine Park (previously known as the Macquarie Island Commonwealth Marine Reserve) is an Australian marine park surrounding Macquarie Island in the southwest Pacific. The marine park covers an area of 475,465 km^{2} (183,578 sq mi) and is assigned IUCN category IV. It is the largest of the 14 parks managed under the South-east Marine Parks Network.

== Conservation values ==
- Examples of ecosystems, habitats and communities associated with the Macquarie Province and associated with the sea-floor features: abyssal plain/deep ocean floor, canyon, escarpment, knoll/abyssal hill, ridge, slope and trench/trough
- Important foraging area for: killer whale, southern elephant seal, Antarctic, Subantarctic and New Zealand fur seals, royal, king, rockhopper and gentoo penguin and wandering albatross.

== History ==
The Marine Park was originally proclaimed on 20 October 1999 as the Macquarie Island Marine Park. The name of the reserve was later changed on 28 June 2007 to the Macquarie Island Commonwealth Marine Reserve. The name was changed again in 2017 back to Macquarie Island Marine Park.

In early 2023, the federal government announced that the park would triple in size, adding an extra 385,000 km^{2} (149,000 sq mi) of protected water to the existing 162,000 km^{2} (63,000 sq mi) of marine park. This expansion came into effect on 1 July 2023.

== Summary of protection zones ==
The Macquarie Island Marine Park has been assigned IUCN protected area category IV. However, within the marine park there are three protection zones, each zone has an IUCN category and related rules for managing activities to ensure the protection of marine habitats and species.

The following table is a summary of the zoning rules within the Macquarie Island Marine Park:

Zone	IUCN	Activities permitted					Total area (km^{2})
Zone	IUCN	Vessel transiting	Recreational fishing	Commercial fishing	Commercial tourism	Mining	Total area (km^{2})
Sanctuary Zone	Ia	No	No	No	aviation only (>3000m)	No	57,056
National Park Zone	II	Yes	No	No	authorisation required	No	385,127
Habitat Protection	IV	Yes	No	authorisation required	authorisation required	No	33,282
External links: Activity prescriptions for Macquarie Island Marine Park;Proposal to expand Macquarie Marine Park

== See also ==
- Protected areas managed by the Australian government
