= Corybas sulcatus =

Conservation status
- Critically endangered (EPBC Act)

Scientific classification
- Kingdom: Plantae
- Clade: Tracheophytes
- Clade: Angiosperms
- Clade: Monocots
- Order: Asparagales
- Family: Orchidaceae
- Subfamily: Orchidoideae
- Tribe: Diurideae
- Genus: Corybas
- Species: C. sulcatus

Binomial name
- Corybas sulcatus (M.A.Clem. & D.L.Jones) G.N.Backh.

Synonyms
- Nematoceras sulcatum

Species of orchid

Corybas sulcatus, also known as the grooved helmet-orchid, is one of two helmet orchids endemic to Australia's subantarctic Macquarie Island, and the second to be discovered. The Latin specific epithet sulcatus means "grooved”, with reference to the prominent groove in the labellum boss. It is a small, terrestrial, tuberous, herbaceous plant that forms clonal colonies. The flower is erect, mostly dark red, 25–30 mm long and 10–14 mm wide. The flowering period is November–December. It occurs on the plateau uplands of the island, growing in wet grassy seepage areas. It can be distinguished from the only other orchid on the island, Corybas dienemus, by its dark red flowers.

== Conservation status ==
Macquarie Island is a nature reserve, a World Heritage Site and a UNESCO Biosphere Reserve. However, the orchid is listed as endangered on the Tasmanian Threatened Species Protection Act 1995 because of its restricted distribution, small population (estimated in 2010 to comprise fewer than 250 mature individual plants), and projected decline through ongoing habitat degradation caused by the grazing, digging and burrowing activities of feral rabbits. It is classified as "Critically endangered" under the EPBC Act.
