= Corybas dienemus =

Windswept helmet-orchid

Conservation status
- Critically endangered (EPBC Act)

Scientific classification
- Kingdom: Plantae
- Clade: Tracheophytes
- Clade: Angiosperms
- Clade: Monocots
- Order: Asparagales
- Family: Orchidaceae
- Subfamily: Orchidoideae
- Tribe: Diurideae
- Genus: Corybas
- Species: C. dienemus

Binomial name
- Corybas dienemus D.L.Jones

Synonyms
- Nematoceras dienemum (D.L.Jones) D.L.Jones, M.A.Clem. & Molloy; Corysanthes dienema (D.L.Jones) Szlach.

Species of orchid

Corybas dienemus, commonly known as the windswept helmet-orchid, is one of two helmet orchids endemic to Australia's subantarctic Macquarie Island, and the first orchid to be found there. It is a relatively small orchid with green flowers with purplish-red markings and was discovered in 1978.

== Description ==
The windswept helmet-orchid is a relatively small (30–50 mm tall), terrestrial, tuberous, herbaceous plant that forms clonal colonies. The leaves are flattish, fleshy and solitary, dark green above and silvery-green underneath. The flower is erect, nestling in the leaf base, green with purplish-red markings, 25–30 mm long and 20–25 mm wide. It can be distinguished from its congener and the only other orchid on the island, the grooved helmet-orchid Corybas sulcatus, by its predominantly green flowers, compared with the predominantly dark red ones of C. sulcatus.

== Taxonomy and naming ==
This orchid was first discovered on Macquarie Island in 1978 and identified as Corybas macranthus, which is widespread in New Zealand. It was then recognised in 1993 by David Jones as a new species that he named Corybas dienemus. In 2002, it was transferred to the reinstated genus Nematoceras as Nematoceras dienemum but that name has not been accepted by World Checklist of Selected Plant Families at Royal Botanic Gardens, Kew. The specific epithet (dienemum) is an Ancient Greek word meaning "windswept".

== Distribution and habitat ==
The orchid is known from ten sites on the northern half of Macquarie Island, where it inhabits the lower coastal terraces, not more than 30 m above sea level, where the vegetation is dominated by mosses that float on a substrate of waterlogged peat with a water table very close to the soil surface. The total known population comprises about 7500 plants.

== Reproduction ==
The flowering period of the orchid is from November to January. It produces seeds annually but also reproduces vegetatively through the production of daughter root-tubers on lateral underground stolons. Its leaves die off in autumn, with new leaves emerging in spring. Although the life expectancy and age of sexual maturity of the orchid are unknown, it is likely that some clonal colonies have existed for several decades. The pollination method is unknown, though one possible pollinator is the Black Fungus Gnat (Bradysia watsoni), which is common on the coastal terraces where the orchid is found.

== Conservation ==
Macquarie Island is a nature reserve, a World Heritage Site and a UNESCO Biosphere Reserve. However, the windswept helmet-orchid is listed as endangered on the Tasmanian Threatened Species Protection Act 1995 because of its restricted distribution, small population and projected decline through ongoing habitat degradation caused by the grazing, digging and burrowing activities of rabbits. Additional threats are the formation of seal wallows and, potentially, climate change. It is also listed as Critically Endangered under Australia's Environment Protection and Biodiversity Conservation Act 1999.

In 2010, a plan to eliminate rabbits from Macquarie Island was implemented and aerial baiting was commenced. Later, hunters and dog handlers destroyed a few surviving rabbits and by 2014, rabbits had been eliminated from the island.
