= Lesser Mackellar Island =

Island of Antarctica

- Location within Antarctica

Geography
- Location: Antarctica
- Coordinates: 66°58′S 142°39′E

Administration
- Administered under the Antarctic Treaty System

Demographics
- Population: Uninhabited

Lesser Mackellar Island is a small island immediately northeast of Greater Mackellar Island in the Mackellar Islands of Antarctica, lying 4 kilometres (2 nmi) north of Cape Denison in the center of Commonwealth Bay. It was discovered and named by the Australasian Antarctic Expedition (1911–14) under Douglas Mawson. The name is indicative of the size of the feature in relation to Greater Mackellar Island.

== Important Bird Area ==
The island forms part of the Mackellar Islands Important Bird Area (IBA), identified as such by BirdLife International because it supports large breeding colonies of Adélie penguins.

== See also ==
- List of Antarctic and Subantarctic islands
