= Trinity House (disambiguation) =

Trinity House may refer to:

Nautical authority agencies

- Trinity House, a UK private corporation governed under a Royal Charter, functions include the official Lighthouse Authority
- Trinity House of Leith
- Trinity House Pilot Station, a former Port Tower in Folkestone Harbour
- Newcastle-upon-Tyne Trinity House
- Hull Trinity House
  - Hull Trinity House Academy, an associated marine training school
- Trinity House, Scarborough, original building for the society of Ship Owners and Master Mariners.

Architecture

- Trinity house (Philadelphia)
