= Blair Islands =

Group of islands off the cost of George V Land, Antarctica

- Location within Antarctica

Geography
- Location: Antarctica
- Coordinates: 66°50′S 143°10′E

Administration
- Administered under the Antarctic Treaty System

Demographics
- Population: Uninhabited

The Blair Islands are a group of small islands lying 7 km (4 nmi) west of Cape Gray, at the east side of the entrance to Commonwealth Bay, George V Land, Antarctica. They were discovered by the Australasian Antarctic Expedition (1911–14) under Douglas Mawson, who named the group for John H. Blair, Chief Officer on the Aurora.

== See also ==
- List of Antarctic and sub-Antarctic islands
