= John Hamilton Blair =

Scottish mariner and officer of the Royal Naval Reserve during WWI

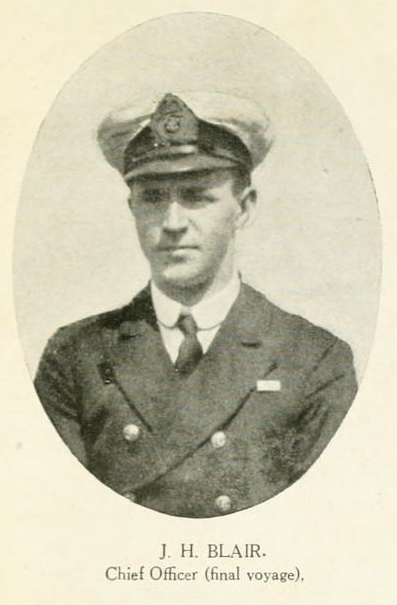
Blair around 1911–1914

John Hamilton Blair (29 July 1889 – September 1972) was a Scottish mariner, who was first officer aboard the SY Aurora during the Australasian Antarctic Expedition in 1913–1914. He later served in the Royal Navy during the First World War, where he was awarded the Distinguished Service Cross, as the head of Pangbourne Nautical College, and returned to the Navy during the Second World War.

During his early career, he worked aboard the Loch Line, which operated between Britain and Australia. He then joined a Melbourne shipping company, and worked the Australia–India trade. From 1913 to 1914, Blair served as chief officer aboard the SY Aurora, under John King Davis, during the final Antarctic voyage of the Australasian Antarctic expedition (AAE). The Blair Islands, in Commonwealth Bay in Antarctica, were named after him by Douglas Mawson, the expedition leader.

He served as a lieutenant in the Royal Naval Reserve during the First World War, and was awarded the Distinguished Service Cross in 1917. Between the end of 1914 and September 1918, he made 68 submarine patrols in the Heligoland Bight, part of the blockade of the German fleet, before sailing to the Black Sea with HMS M1, where he ended the war.

He later became chief executive officer of Pangbourne Nautical College. During the Second World War he returned to active service, commanding the boarding vessel Maron from 1940 to 1942, and then the auxiliary anti-aircraft ship Mona's Isle on the Tyne from 1942 to 1943.
