= Laseron Islands =

Island group in Antarctica

- Location within Antarctica

Geography
- Location: Antarctica
- Coordinates: 66°59′S 142°48′E

Administration
- Administered under the Antarctic Treaty System

Demographics
- Population: Uninhabited

The Laseron Islands are a chain of small ice-capped and rocky islands lying 6 kilometres (3 nmi) east of Cape Denison in Commonwealth Bay, Antarctica. They were discovered by the Australasian Antarctic Expedition (1911–1914) under Douglas Mawson, who named them for Charles F. Laseron, taxidermist with the expedition.

== See also ==
- List of Antarctic and sub-Antarctic islands
