= Cape Hunter =

Headland of Antarctica

Coordinates: 66°57′S 142°21′E

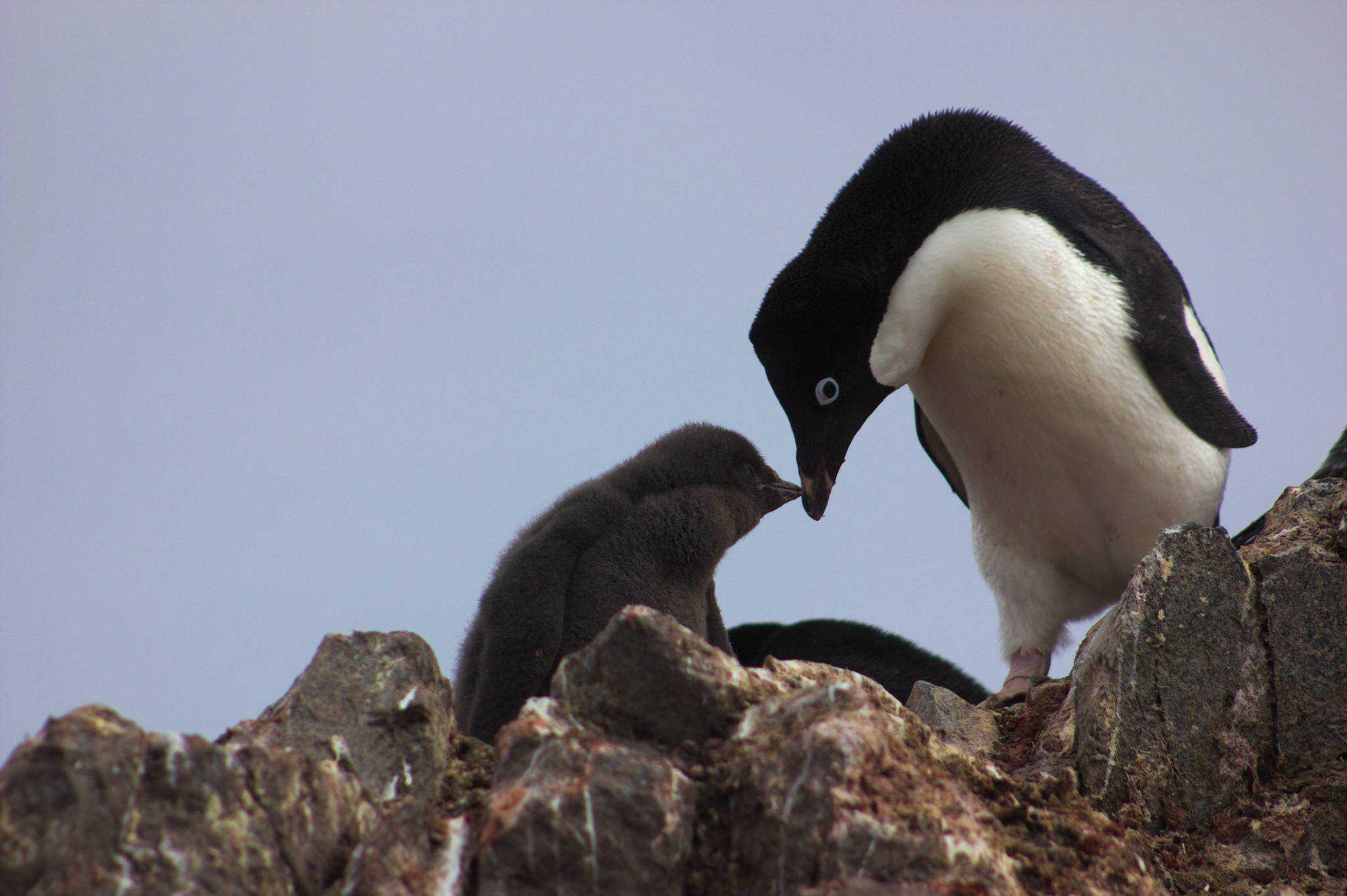
Adélie penguins breed in the IBA

Cape Hunter is a rocky promontory on the west shore of Commonwealth Bay, Antarctica, 8 nautical miles (15 km) west of Cape Denison. It was discovered in 1912 and explored the following year by the Australasian Antarctic Expedition under Douglas Mawson, who named it for John G. Hunter, chief biologist of the expedition.

== Important Bird Area ==
An 11 ha site at the cape has been designated an Important Bird Area (IBA) by BirdLife International because, in 1997/98 it supported a colony of some 16,000 breeding pairs of Adélie penguins. Breeding Antarctic petrels, snow petrels and south polar skuas were also present.
