= SS Victoria (1907) =

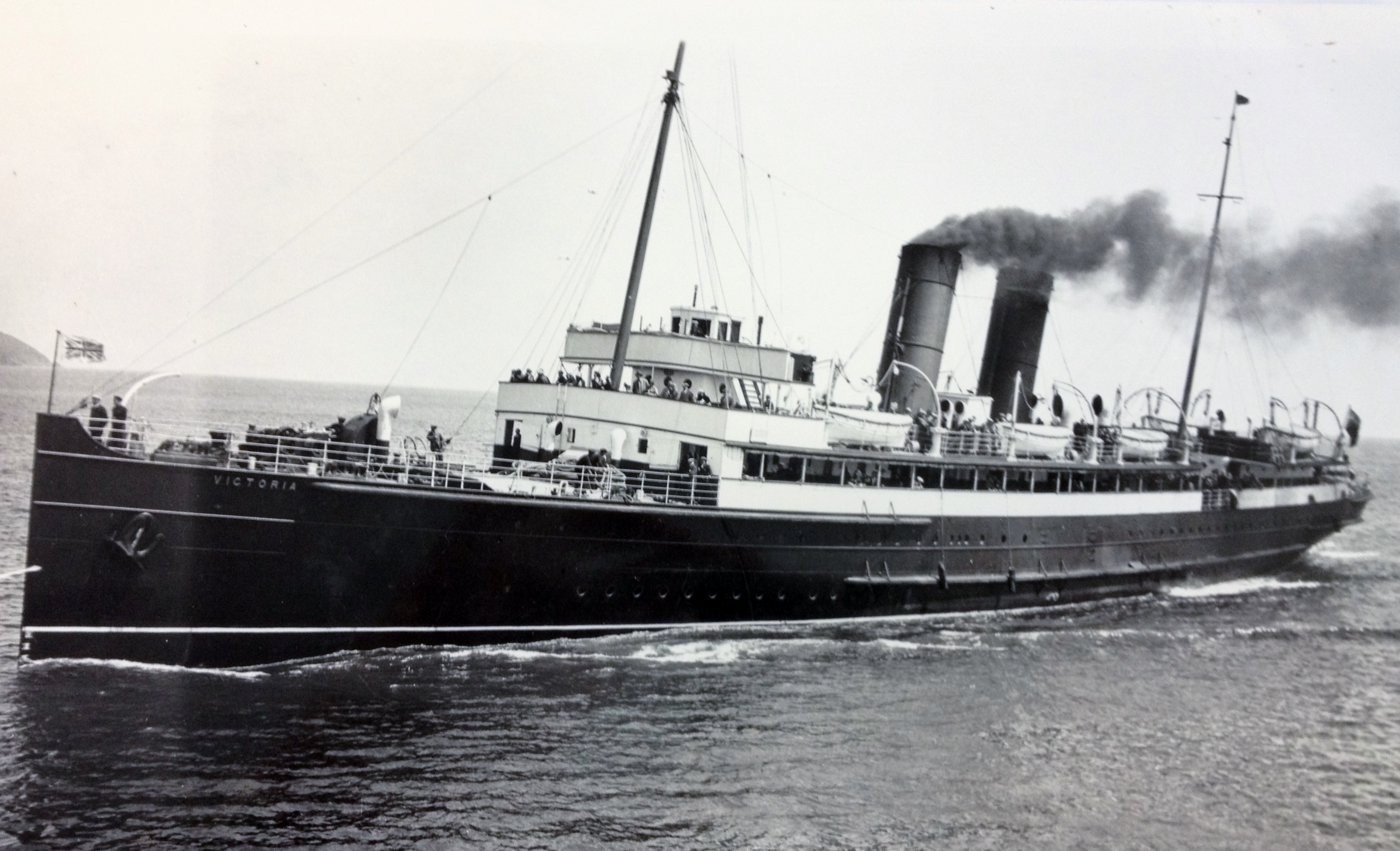
- Victoria entering Douglas Harbour

History
- Name: Victoria
- Owner: 1907–1922: South Eastern and Chatham Railway Company.; 1923-1928 Southern Railway; 1928-1957: Isle of Man Steam Packet Company.
- Port of registry: 1907-1928: London 1928-1957: Douglas, Isle of Man
- Builder: Wm Denny & Co. Dumbarton
- Cost: Purchased by the Isle of Man Steam Packet Company for an initial sum of £25,000 in 1928
- Yard number: 789
- Launched: 27 February 1907
- Maiden voyage: 28 April 1907
- Out of service: 1957
- Identification: Official Number 123811; Code Letters; H K N R; G N T F
- Fate: Scrapped at Barrow 1957

General characteristics
- Type: Packet Steamer.
- Tonnage: 1,641 gross register tons (GRT)
- Length: 311 ft (94.79 m)
- Beam: 40 ft 1 in (12.22 m)
- Depth: 16 ft 6 in (5.03 m)
- Installed power: 7,500 shp (5,600 kW)
- Propulsion: Twin-geared turbines. Working at 7,500 ihp (5,600 kW) producing 22 knots (25 mph)
- Speed: 22 knots (41 km/h)
- Capacity: 1,536 passengers
- Crew: 41

SS (RMS) Victoria was a packet steamer originally owned and operated by the South Eastern and Chatham Railway Company, who sold her to the Isle of Man Steam Packet Company in 1928 for the sum of £25,000 (equivalent to £1,902,608 in 2023).

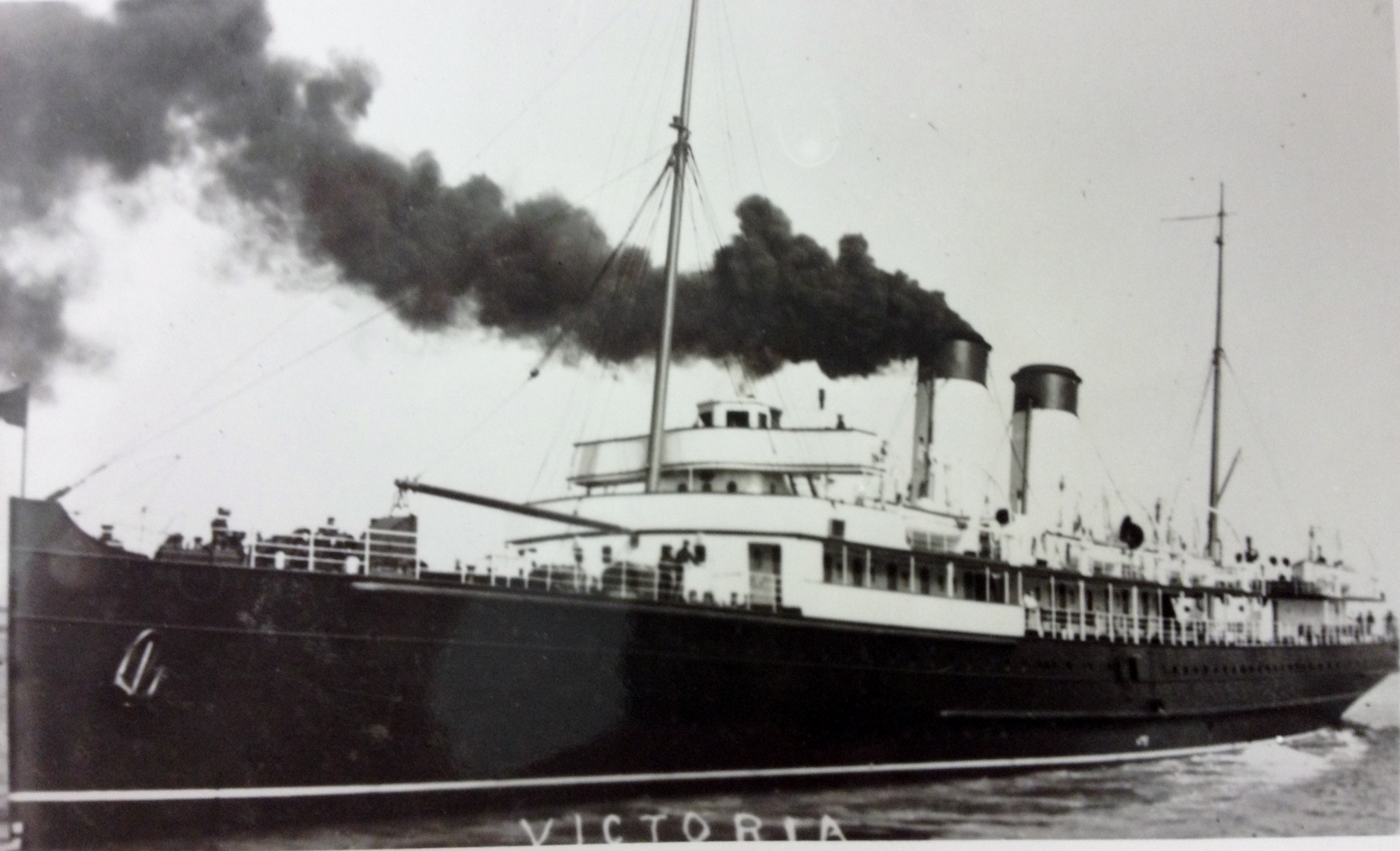
Victoria during her South Eastern and Chatham Railway Company service.

== Construction and dimensions ==
Victoria was a steel; triple-screw turbine driven vessel. She was built at Dumbarton by William Denny and Brothers in 1907.

Length 311 feet 0 inches (94.79 m); beam 40 feet 1 inch (12.22 m); depth 16 feet 6 inches (5.03 m). Victoria had accommodation for a crew of 41, and was certificated to carry 1,536 passengers. Her engines developed 7,500 i.h.p. which gave her a service speed of 22 knots (41 km/h).

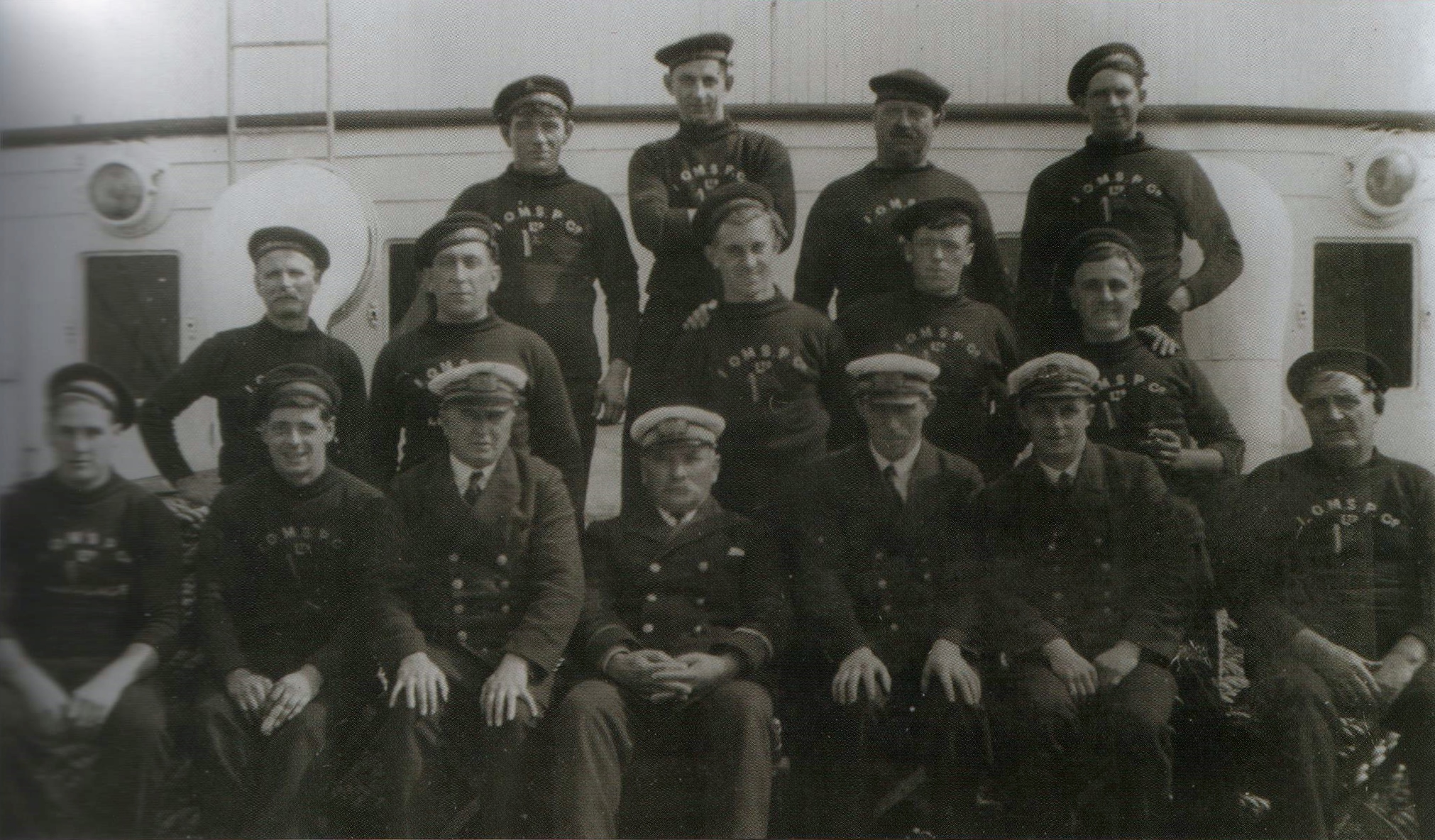
Crew of Victoria, 1929, with Capt. Jack Morrison pictured centre.

She was purchased by the Steam Packet for £25,000 (equivalent to £1,477,249 in 2018). but with alterations the final cost to the company was £37,550 (equivalent to £2,218,828 in 2018).

== Service life ==
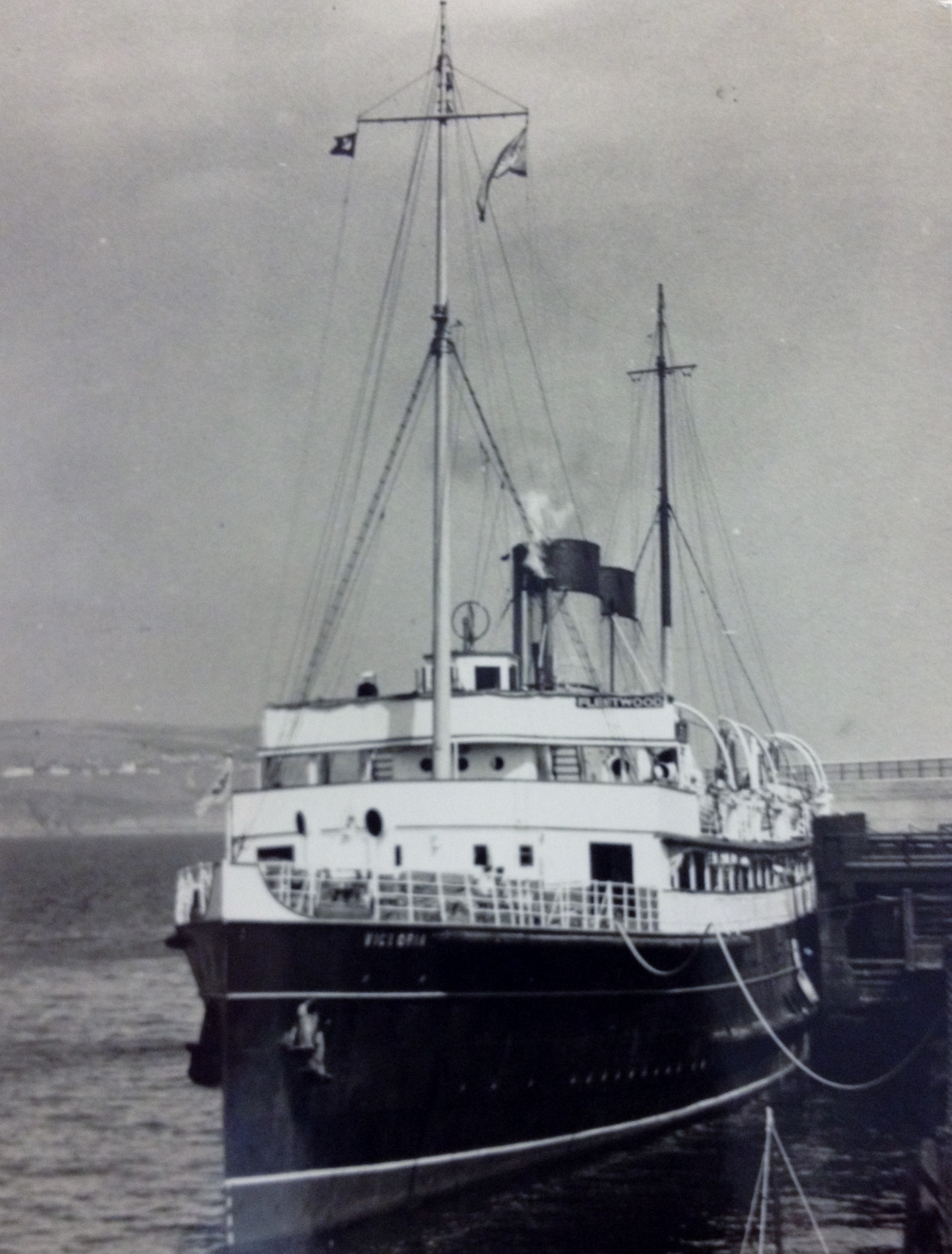
Victoria berthed alongside the Battery Pier, Douglas.

Sister ship of the Mona's Isle, Victoria saw service to the various ports then served by the Isle of Man Steam Packet Company.

Victoria served as tender to the SS Athenia when she called at Doulgas Bay in May, 1937. The purpose of the visit was a Homecoming by Manx expatriates and their descendants. Unfortunately due to a strong swell in Douglas Bay, resulting in a rise and fall of approximately 7 ft (2.13 m), it was thought that it would prove too risky for Victoria to get alongside. A slight collision occurred resulting in part of Victoria's belting becoming detached. However a gangway was secured at the aft end allowing the Homecomers to disembark.

Victoria was chartered by the London Midland & Scottish Railway for one day to assist in the August Bank Holiday traffic on the Holyhead – Dún Laoghaire route in 1938. She made only one return crossing with 1,541 passengers in all, and the fee charged was £450 (equivalent to £28,489 in 2018).

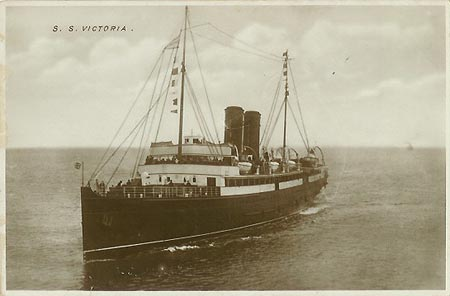
Victoria approaches Douglas

== War service ==
On the home front, the Steam Packet Company's war work was mainly concerned with the maintenance of the Island's lifeline between Douglas and Liverpool, and at the outbreak of war, it was decided that this would become the primary duty of the Victoria and the Rushen Castle.

Minefields were laid by the Royal Navy around the approaches to the Mersey as a protection against enemy U-boats, and Steam Packet Company Captains would be given orders on how to proceed.

Victoria is generally regarded as having spent the war years plying from Douglas, at first to Liverpool and then to Fleetwood. This she did for much of the time.

Victoria was the only Company ship to be struck by a mine in the Irish Sea. This occurred on 27 December 1940, when she was homeward bound with passengers from Liverpool, under the command of Captain John Keig. She was holed by a magnetic mine when northwest of the Bar Lightship.

Some of her passengers, of whom there were more than 200, were taken off by the trawler Yulan, and taken on to Douglas where they were landed safely. Others were returned to Liverpool by the pilot boat, whilst the Victoria was taken under tow back to Liverpool.

There were no casualties, but the incident had important consequences for the company. The Victoria was later fitted out as a LSI (H) – Landing Ship Infantry (Hand Hoisting) – after her mine damage had been repaired, and she then worked out of the Firth of Forth as a target ship. After an overhaul in Leith and service from Dundee, she was ordered to Southampton in the summer of 1943, where she was employed on training infantry for the forthcoming assault on Occupied Europe. She did this work for some months, mainly under Portland Command, practicing landings.

On D-Day, 6 June 1944, Victoria was one of the vessels scheduled to land assault forces on the western extreme of the small bay of Arromanches, which was one of the three British Army spearheads into Occupied France.

Whilst the landing was successfully executed, a German flack-ship on routine anti-invasion exercise was in the bay and was able to produce superior fire power to the wave of assault craft which were discharging the troops. Nevertheless, despite losses, the bridgehead held and was able to support the construction of one of the Mulberry Harbours.

During this time, the Victoria's crew retained Steam Packet men as officers, and she continued to fly the Red Ensign under the command of Capt. Keig. Her landing craft however, were manned by naval men, whose officers were mainly R.N.V.R.

Some days after D-Day, the Victoria landed American assault forces on Utah Beach, where resistance had been encountered. She then proceeded to service the harbour at Arromanches, landing troops and supplies.

As the war moved east, Victoria reverted to work as a personnel carrier. She became something of an emergency hospital ship, lifting sick and injured troops and ferrying them mainly to shore based hospitals around Dieppe. When not engaged in this line of work, the ship was used to return troops to England for leave.

== Post-war Service ==
Victoria resumed her duties with the Steam Packet fleet following the defeat of Germany in 1945.

In her latter years she was mainly used as an excursion ship operating between Douglas and Liverpool. At the end of the 1956 season an inspection revealed the necessary work required in order for her to be re-issued with her passenger certificate could not be justified.

Coupled to this with the aftermath of the Suez Crisis resulting in increased operating costs by the Steam Packet as a consequence of higher oil prices, together with introduction into service of the six sisters, the decision was taken to dispose of her at the end of the 1956 tourist season.

It was decided that the excursions for which she was used would instead be undertaken by a chartered vessel, the St Seiriol.

Upon her decommissioning, her ship's bell was presented to the Cronk Ruagh Sanatorium at Ramsey, Hospital, Isle of Man.

== Disposal ==
Victoria was put up for sale in January 1957 and subsequently sold. She was broken up at Barrow. Victoria was the last triple-screw direct drive turbine steamer in the company's fleet.

== Gallery ==
RMS Victoria.
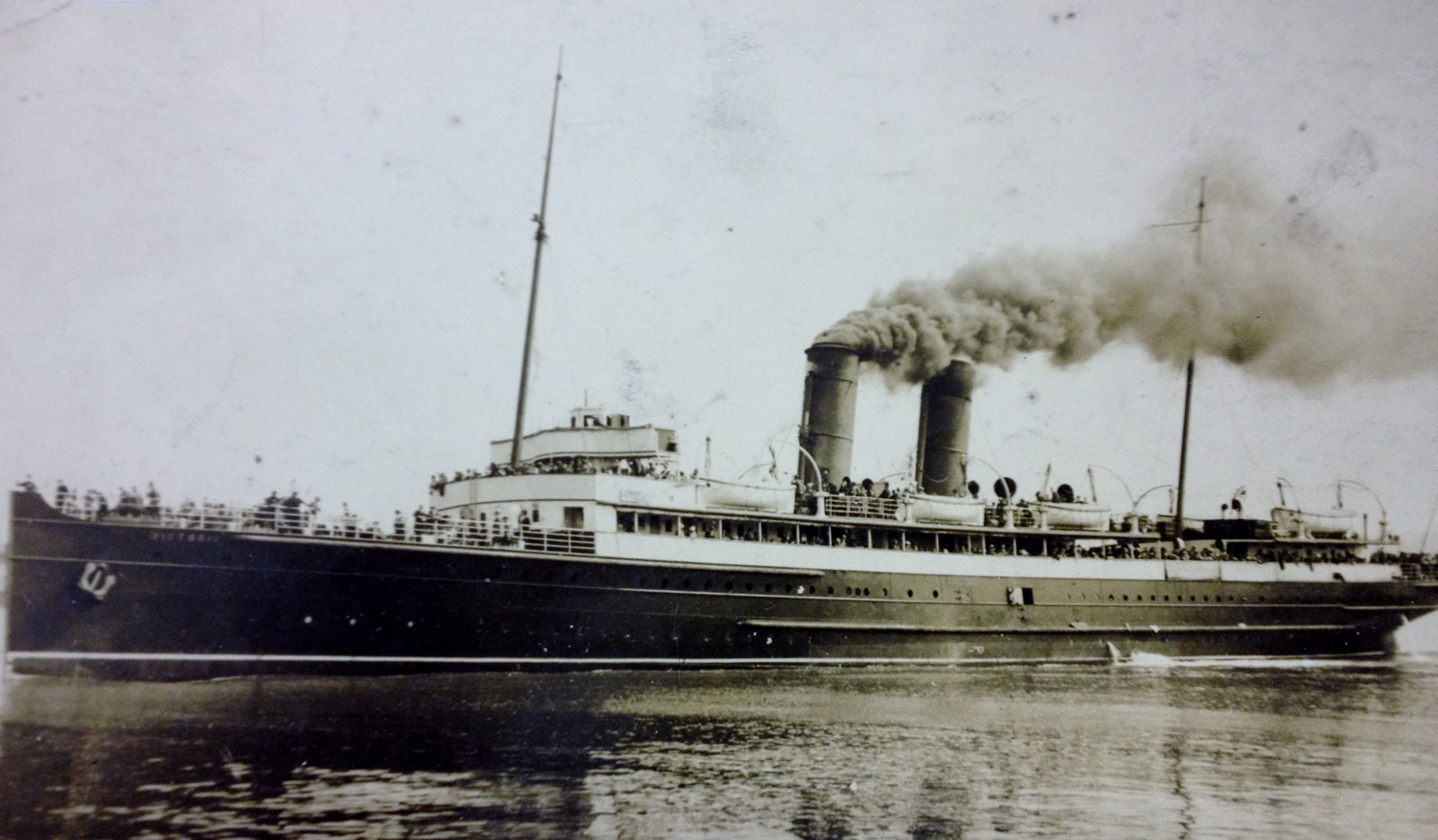
Victoria in operational service.

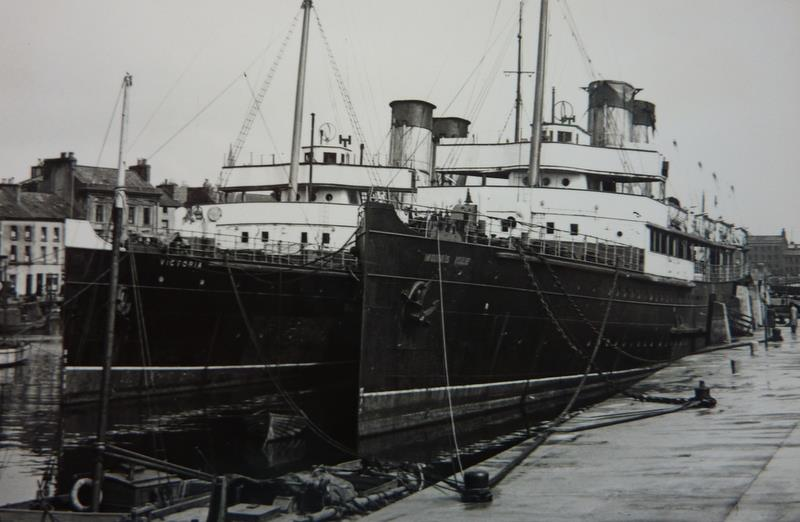
Victoria (left) and Mona's Isle (right), laid up at the Tongue, Douglas.

== See also ==
- List of ships built by William Denny and Brothers
