= Cape Gray =

Peninsula in Antarctica

- Cape
- Coordinates: 66°51′S 143°22′E

Cape Gray is a rocky cape which forms the east side of the entrance to Commonwealth Bay, part of the George V Coast of Antarctica. The cape is actually a small rocky island which is joined to the icecap of the mainland by an ice ramp. It was discovered by the Australasian Antarctic Expedition (1911–1914) under Douglas Mawson, who named it for Percival Gray, second officer on the expedition ship Aurora.
