= Percival Gray =

Australian naval officer

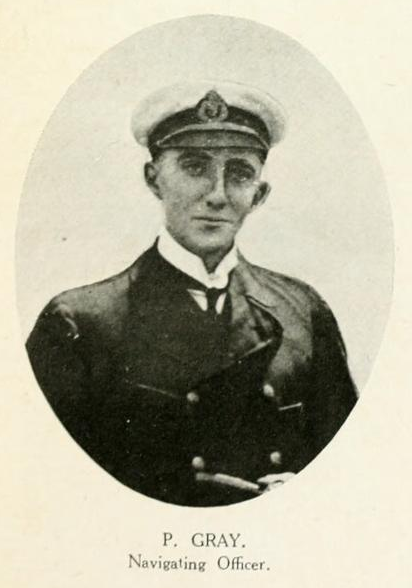
Gray around 1911–1914

Percival Gray (5 January 1889 – November 1944) was an Australian naval officer. During his early career he served on HMS Worcester and the Archibald Russell, and then joined the New Zealand Shipping Company.

From 1909 to 1911 he worked for P&O. During this time he attained his first officer's certificate.

From 1911 to 1914, during the Australasian Antarctic expedition, he served as second and navigating officer aboard the SY Aurora, under John King Davis, for all five cruises.

Cape Gray, in King George V Land in Antarctica, was named after him by Douglas Mawson.
