= Mackellar Islands =

Islands of Antarctica

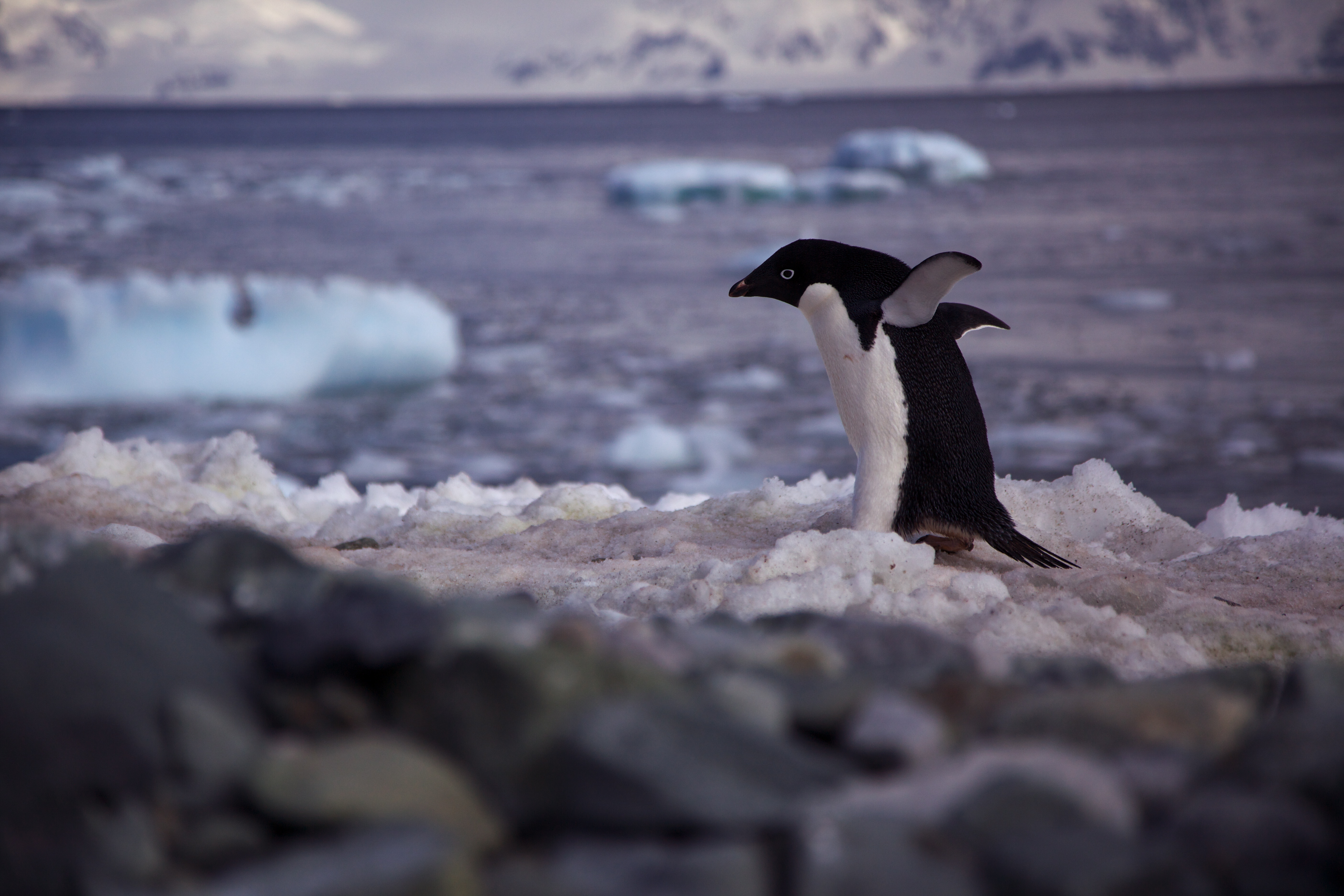
- Adélie penguins breed in the IBA

- Location within Antarctica

Geography
- Location: Antarctica
- Coordinates: 66°58′S 142°40′E
- Total islands: 30

Administration
- Administered under the Antarctic Treaty System

Demographics
- Population: Uninhabited

The Mackellar Islands, also MacKellar Islets, are a group of about 30 small islands and rocks lying 3 kilometres (1.5 nmi) north of Cape Denison in the center of Commonwealth Bay, George V Land, Antarctica. They were discovered by the Australasian Antarctic Expedition (1911–14) under Douglas Mawson, who named them for C.D. Mackellar of London, a patron of the expedition. The largest is Greater Mackellar Island.

== Important Bird Area ==
A 346 ha site comprising the island group and intervening sea has been designated an Important Bird Area (IBA) by BirdLife International because it supports colonies of Adélie penguins, totalling some 80,000 breeding pairs, an estimate based on 2011 satellite imagery. Other birds reported as breeding on the islands in small numbers include snow petrels, Wilson's storm petrels and south polar skuas.

== See also ==
- List of Antarctic and Subantarctic islands
