= Greater Mackellar Island =

Island of Antarctica

- Location within Antarctica

Geography
- Location: Antarctica
- Coordinates: 66°58′S 142°39′E
- Length: 1.1 km (0.68 mi)
- Width: 0.5 km (0.31 mi)

Administration
- Administered under the Antarctic Treaty System

Demographics
- Population: Uninhabited

Greater Mackellar Island, also Great Mackellar Islet, is the largest of the Mackellar Islands, lying 4 kilometres (2 nmi) north of Cape Denison in the center of Commonwealth Bay, Antarctica. It was discovered and named by the Australasian Antarctic Expedition (1911–14) under Douglas Mawson. The Island is about 1100 m long, and up to 500 m wide.

== Important Bird Area ==
The island forms part of the Mackellar Islands Important Bird Area (IBA), identified as such by BirdLife International because it supports large breeding colonies of Adélie penguins.

== See also ==
- List of Antarctic and Subantarctic islands
