= Point Alden =

Geographical object

Coordinates: 66°48′S 142°02′E

Point Alden is an ice-covered point in Antarctica with rock exposures along the seaward side. The point marks the western side of the entrance to Commonwealth Bay and the division between Adélie Coast and George V Coast in Antarctica. The point was discovered on January 30, 1840, by the USEE under Lt. Charles Wilkes, and named by him for Lt. James Alden of the expedition's flagship Vincennes.
