= SS Mona's Isle (1905) =

Steam turbine passenger ship, 1905 to 1948

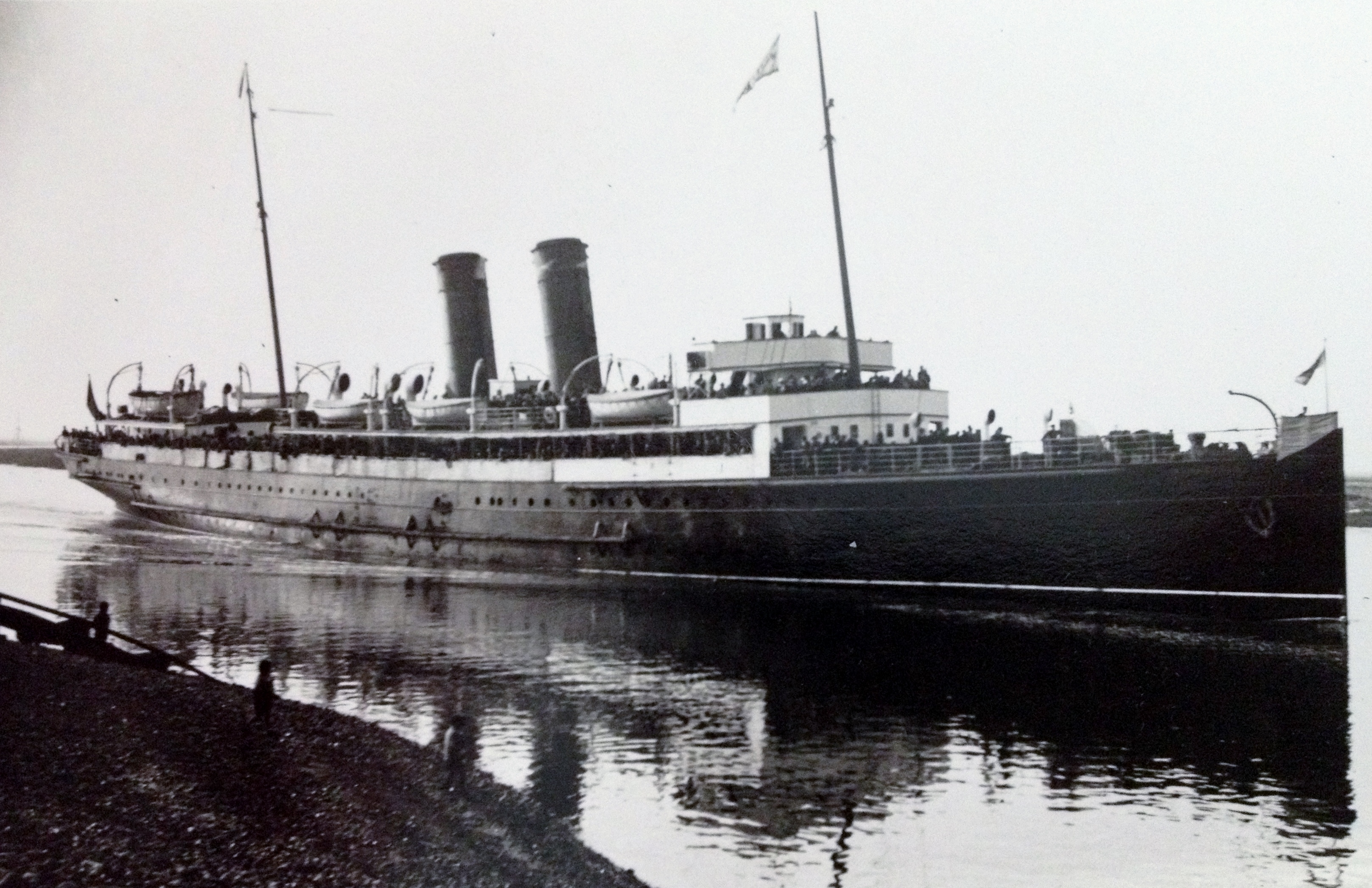
- Mona's Isle

History
- Name: 1905: Onward; 1920: Mona's Isle
- Owner: 1905: South Eastern & Chatham Rly; 1920: Isle of Man SP Co
- Operator: 1939: Royal Navy
- Port of registry: 1905: (United Kingdom) London; 1920: Douglas, Isle of Man
- Route: 1905–1918: Folkestone – Boulogne 1920–1948: Mainly summer Douglas – Dublin / Belfast.
- Builder: Wm Denny & Bros, Dumbarton
- Yard number: 751
- Laid down: 1905
- Launched: 11 March 1905
- In service: 1905
- Out of service: 1948
- Refit: 1920
- Identification: UK official number 120522; code letters HCMF (until 1933); call sign: SEO (by 1913); GUM (1914 onward); GFPN (1930 onward)
- Fate: Scrapped at Milford Haven 1948

General characteristics
- Type: packet ship
- Tonnage: 1914: 1,671 GRT, 692 NRT
- Length: 311.2 ft (94.9 m)
- Beam: 40.1 ft (12.2 m)
- Depth: 15.8 ft (4.8 m)
- Decks: 2
- Installed power: 7,500 ihp (5,600 kW)
- Propulsion: 3 × screws; 3 × steam turbines
- Speed: 22 knots (41 km/h)
- Capacity: 1,479 passengers
- Crew: 70
- Notes: sister ship: Victoria

SS Mona's Isle was a steam turbine passenger ship that was built in Scotland in 1905 as Onward, renamed Mona's Isle in 1920, and scrapped in Wales in 1948. She was designed as an English Channel ferry for the South Eastern and Chatham Railway (SE&CR), who operated her between Folkestone and Boulogne. In 1920 the Isle of Man Steam Packet Company (IoMSP) bought her and renamed her Mona's Isle. The IoMSP ran her mainly on summer services linking Douglas with Dublin and Belfast. She was the fourth IoMSP ship to be called Mona's Isle.

In 1918 Onward caught fire in Folkestone Harbour, and was saved by being scuttled. In 1920 she was raised, which was when the IOMSPCo bought her to replace ships lost during the First World War. In 1940 Mona's Isle was the first ship to complete a round trip during the Dunkirk evacuation, rescuing a total of 2,634 troops.

== Building & dimensions ==
William Denny and Brothers built Onward at Dumbarton. She was launched on 11 March 1905 and completed that April. She had a steel hull, her registered length was 311.2 ft (94.9 m), her beam was 40.1 ft (12.2 m) and her depth was 15.8 ft (4.8 m). Her tonnages were 1,671 GRT and 692 NRT.

She had a crew of 70, and was certified to carry 1,479 passengers. She had three screws, each driven by a steam turbine. Between them her three turbines developed a total of 7,500 ihp (5,600 kW) and gave her a service speed of 22 knots (41 km/h).

== Identification ==
Onward's UK official number was 120522 and her code letters were HCMF. By 1913 she was equipped for wireless telegraphy and her call sign was SEO. In 1914 this was changed to GUM. By 1930 her call sign was GFPN.

== Onward ==
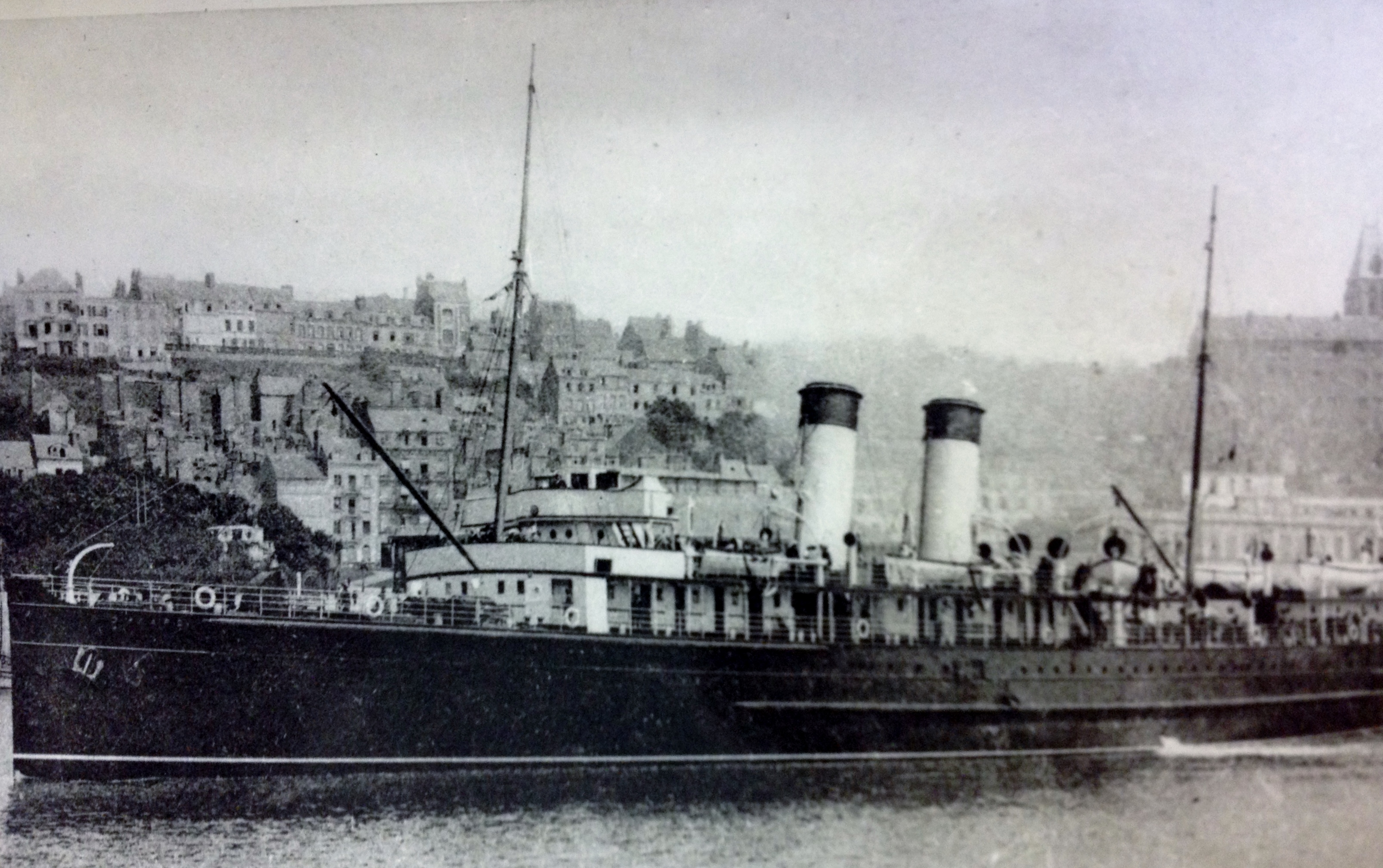
Onward at Boulogne in 1914

Onward served mainly the Folkestone – Boulogne route. Her most prestigious passenger in her cross-channel service was King Edward VII, who crossed from Dover to Calais aboard her on 4 May 1905. In 1907 she was joined by a sister ship, Victoria, also built by William Denny and Brothers.

On 1 June 1908, Onward was involved in a head-on collision with another SE&CR ferry, The Queen, killing the bow lookout man. After the collision, Onward returned to Folkestone, and from there to Dumbarton, where she spent a month in Denny's shipyard being repaired. When she returned to service, Onward became the fisst ferry to carry a motor car across the English Channel.

=== First World War ===
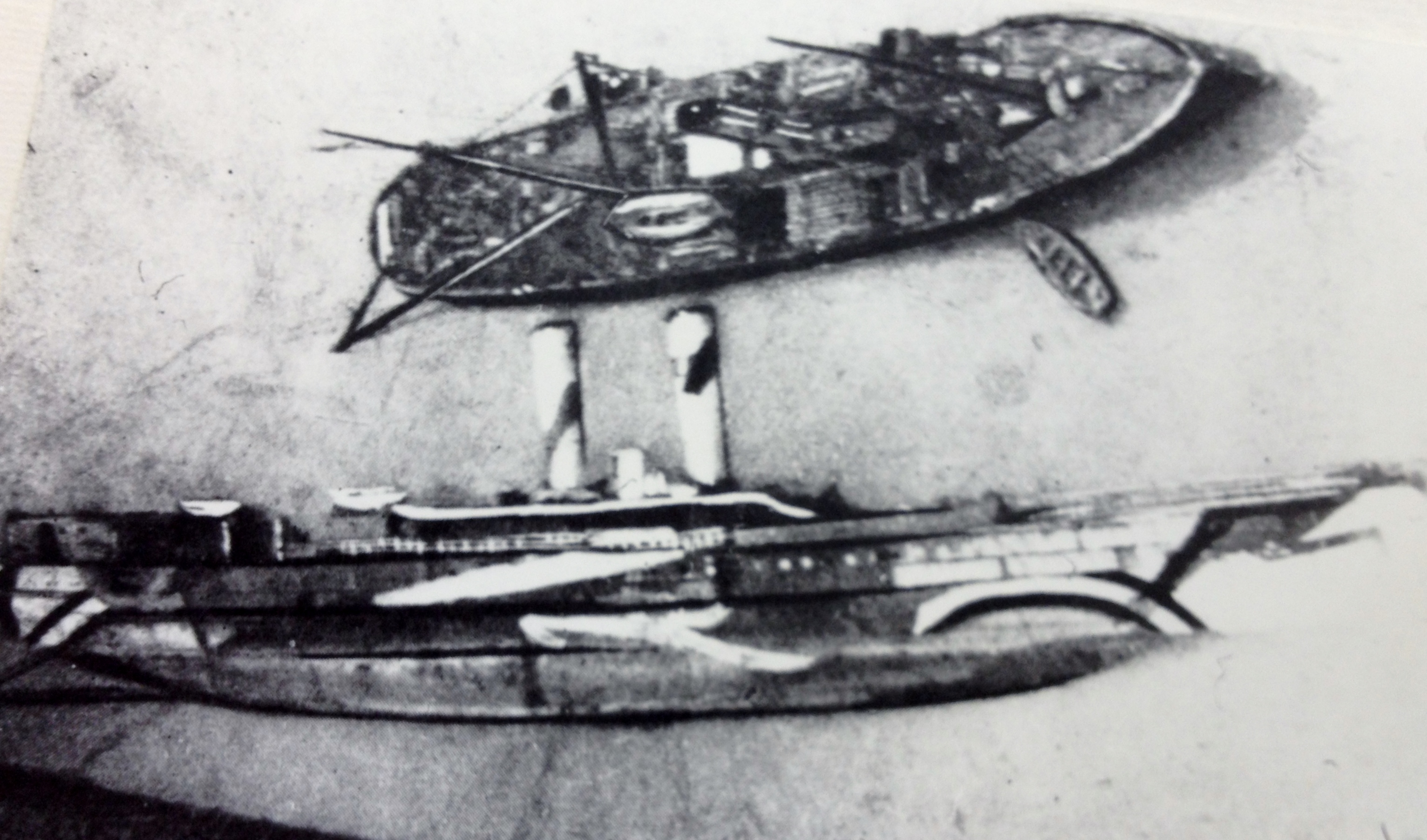
Aerial view of Onward, in First World War dazzle camouflage, lying on her portside, after being scuttled in Folkestone Harbour in September 1918

In the First World War Onward carried British Expeditionary Force troops on her regular route between Folkestone and Boulogne.

On 24 September 1918 a thermite bomb started a fire aboard Onward when she was moored alongside a pier in Folkestone Harbour. The fire took hold, and to prevent the fire spreading to the pier she was scuttled. She capsized onto her port side, and later was hauled upright by a team of five steam locomotives working together.

== Mona's Isle ==
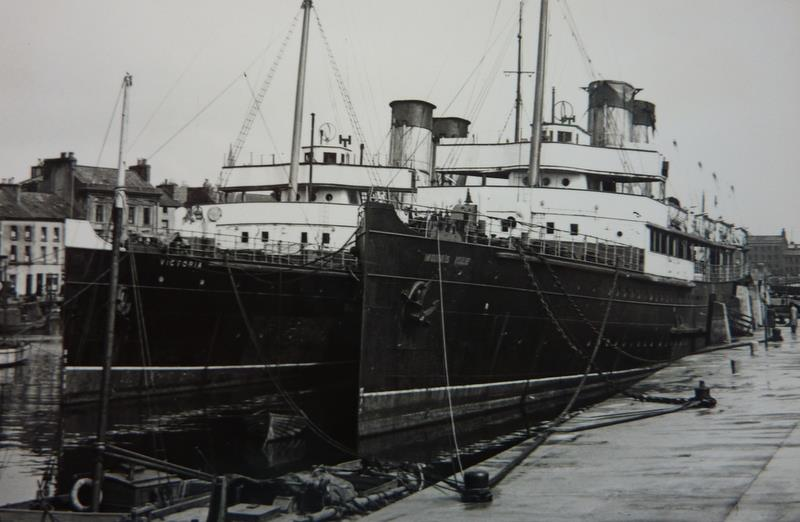
Sister ships Victoria (left) and Mona's Isle (right), laid up one winter at the Tongue, Douglas

In the First World War the Admiralty had bought or chartered eleven IoMSP ships. After the war only four returned, so the company urgently needed replacement ships to resume peacetime services. In order to meet tourist demand in 1919 the company bought the Laird Line ship Hazel and renamed her Mona. Next the IoMSP bought Onward's wreck and had her refitted. She was transferred to the IoMSP at Union Dock, Limehouse Basin, in the Port of London, and became the only IoMSP ship to carry the Manx flag down the River Thames. She began IoMSP service as Onward, and was renamed Mona's Isle on 27 August 1920. In 1920 the IoMSP also bought her sister ship Victoria.

Mona's Isle served various IoMSP routes, but mainly worked summer services linking Douglas with Belfast and Dublin. On Monday, 29 June 1936, she struck the Devil's Rock in Balscadden Bay, but reached Dublin safely. She was taking on water and had to be repaired before her return trip to Douglas.

=== Second World War ===
After the Second World War began, the Admiralty requisitioned several IoMSP ships and had them converted into ocean boarding vessels (OBVs). Mona's Isle was requisitioned on 24 September 1939. Toward the end of May 1940, Mona' Isle was one of eight IoMSP ships that were sent to Dunkirk to help to evacuate the British Expeditionary Force in Operation Dynamo. According to Admiralty records, Mona's Isle was the first ship to leave Dover for Dunkirk when the Dunkirk evacuation began, apart from the destroyer HMS Wolsey, which acted as a radio link ship.

Mona's Isle left Dover at 21:00 hrs on 27 May 1940. Her overnight crossing of the Strait of Dover was uneventful, and she docked in Dunkirk about midnight. She embarked 1,420 troops and she left at first light the next morning. [The signal to commence Operation Dynamo was given at 18:57 on 26 May. Therefore to qualify as the first ship to leave, it is more probable that Mona's Isle sailed from Dover at 21:00 that evening, not 27 May.]

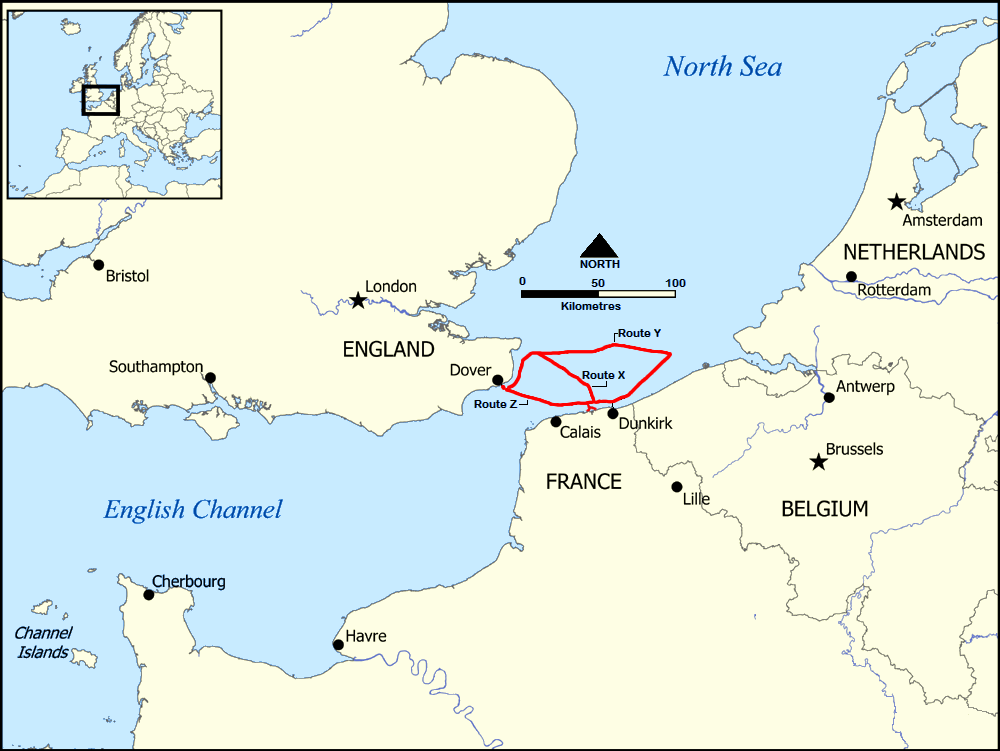
Map of the three evacuation routes

Three routes were allocated to the evacuating vessels. The shortest was "Route Z", 39 nautical miles (72 km), which went west from Dunkirk along the French coast as far as No.6 Buoy, then turned west-northwest straight to Dover. The longest was "Route Y", 87 nautical miles (161 km), went east along the French and Belgian coast as far as Bray-Dunes then turned north-northeast until reaching the Kwinte Buoy. From there ships went west-northwest, then west to the North Goodwin Lightship, then south round the Goodwin Sands to Dover. "Route Y" was 55 nautical miles (102 km). It was the safest from German shore batteries, but passed through a heavily mined part of the English Channel. "Route X" went north from Dunkirk, through the Ruytingen Pass to the North Goodwin Lightship and then south around the Goodwin Sands to Dover. The combination of the minefields and sandbanks meant Route X could be used in daylight hours only.

Mona's Isle returned by Route Z and came under fire from German shore batteries on the French coast. Many shells exploded near her, spraying water over her decks. Some shells hit her but failed to explode. One fell aft and smashed her rudder. By differential use of port and starboard engines, the ship could still be steered. A Messerschmitt Bf 109 strafed her twice, killing 23 men and wounding 60. She reached Dover escorted by the destroyer HMS Windsor. The mission had taken nearly 15 hours.

For their parts in the action her commanding officer, Cdr John Dowding RNR was awarded the Distinguished Service Order and Petty Officer LB Kearley-Pope, RNR was awarded the Distinguished Service Medal. He had remained at a 12-pounder gun despite multiple wounds, and took a great risk in coming out of cover to close the cordite boxes. There were casualties among the gun's crew, but Kearley-Pope continued his duties until the ship berthed six hours later. Cdr Dowding was later promoted to captain. In 1942 he was commodore of Convoy PQ 17 to Russia, which was forced to scatter and suffered heavy losses.

Mona's Isle made a second round trip to Dunkirk, evacuating another 1,200 troops, and bringing her total to 2,634.

Mona's Isle spent the rest of the war as an OBV and then an accommodation ship. She was transferred to the River Tyne in 1941, where she contributed to the anti-aircraft defence of coastal convoys. Twice she assisted cargo ships that had been bombed, in one case rescuing 32 survivors. But three times she was involved in collisions, one of which did extensive damage for which she spent three months being repaired in dry dock. After the Normandy landings she provided cross-Channel transport until June 1945, when the Ministry of War Transport chartered her. She was returned to her owners in March 1946.

=== Post-war ===
After the Second World War, Mona's Isle returned to IoMSP service. She was withdrawn when the "Six Sisters" entered service in 1948. She arrived at Milford Haven in Wales on 12 October 1948 to be scrapped.

== Bibliography ==
- Chappell, Connery (1980). Island Lifeline T. Stephenson & Sons Ltd ISBN 0-901314-20-X
