= Trinity House Pilot Station =

Tower in Folkestone, Kent, England

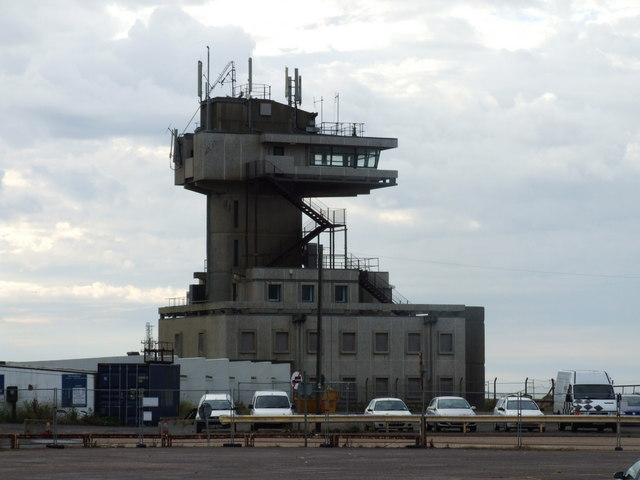
- Trinity House Pilot Station, Folkestone.
- Interactive map of the Trinity House Pilot Station area

General information
- Architectural style: Brutalist
- Coordinates: 51°4′39″N 1°11′12″E
- Year built: 1971

Design and construction
- Architects: John Hill; Andrews, Kent & Stone Ltd.

Trinity House Pilot Station was a port tower located at Folkestone Harbour. The building was first announced by Trinity House in 1967 as a method of relocating pilotage services in Dover, to a new base in Folkestone. Construction began in 1967, with the building itself designed by architect John Hill in collaboration with structural engineers Andrews, Kent & Stone Limited. The building opened in 1971 and operated until its eventual shutdown in 1988, owing to improving technologies and the passing of the 1987 Pilotage Act. The building was declared structurally unsound and was ultimately demolished in 2014, to make way for new developments in the surrounding area.

== Background ==
Trinity House was founded by Royal Charter in 1514, taking on responsibilities for lighthouses, pilotage, lightvessels, buoys and navigational aids, mostly covering the North Sea. Commercial boats stopping at UK ports are levied which are used to fund the authority.

Discussions of establishing a pilot station in Folkestone date as far back as 1857, at which time a short piece published in the Dover Telegraph and Cinque Ports General Advertiser described the "individual interests" as "beneficial" and "a consummation devoutly to be wished". At this time however, the paper acknowledged that sailors would not gain much advantage from being able to ship pilots from Folkestone. Strong winds from the south-east and south-west were also given as another reason for "insuperable difficulty" in the establishment of a pilot station in the town.

== Operational history ==
=== Construction ===
Trinity House announced their decision to build a permanent pilot station at Folkestone in 1967, having recently moved their pilotage services from Dover to Folkestone. Five pilot cutters based in Dover became redundant (one hundred officers were not however). Costing an estimated £175,000 (equivalent to £2,788,473 in 2025), the building would feature a 70ft high-speed launch, a 40ft regular launch, and would stand 68ft tall. Construction was temporarily paused on the night of 17 June 1970, after unexploded ordinance was located within a cooling intake 30 feet underground. A bomb disposal unit was sent to the west beach to drill a shaft to remove the ordinance.

=== Operational years ===
The port tower was opened on 30 March 1971 by J. H. Kirby after four years of construction as a port authority. Costing approximately £250,000 (equivalent to £3,983,533 in 2025) to build, the objective was to improve the efficiency of the Cinque Ports channel and Margate Pilots shipping routes. The station was situated at the edge of the London Pilotage district, functioning as the direct replacement for cutters located at Dungeness. The area was notorious for bad weather, including strong winds. To counter this, the Lodesman was brought into service and remained stationed at the harbour. The station was equipped with the latest equipment, including radar, multi-frequency (MF) and very high frequency (VHF) radio. The building had quarters, mess rooms, and a lounge for pilots on night and morning shift work on standby.

Future Prime Minister Margaret Thatcher visited the port tower facility in 1977, driving the pilot boat Lodesman for ten minutes at a speed of 11 knots. The Lodesman sided with the 44,000 ton cargo ship Australian Venture, under the direction of Captain Robert Eiley, who guided her into Tilbury. The sea was described as "choppy" by an onboard pilot. Thatcher described her visit as a "tribute" to Trinity House, wanting to learn about how the organisation functioned and saying people "take for granted the lighthousemen [sic], lifeboatmen and pilots who make the sea safer for us".

== Shutdown and demolition ==
The Pilotage Act was introduced in 1987, transferring the district pilotage responsibilities of Trinity House to local harbour authorities. Due to technological advances in radio, radar and communications, the pilot station was closed in 1988. The building was later declared structurally unsound and beyond economic repair, despite being listed as available to rent in the Dover Express five years after its closure.

=== Demolition ===
In 2014, a fortnight after the closure of the Folkestone Harbour branch line, work began on demolishing the station ahead of major redevelopments in the surrounding area.
