= George V Coast =

Coast in Antarctica

George V Coast (68°30′S 148°0′E) is that portion of the coast of Antarctica lying between Point Alden, at 148°2′E, and Cape Hudson, at 153°45′E.

Portions of this coast were sighted by the US Exploring Expedition in 1840. It was explored by members of the Main Base party of the Australasian Antarctic Expedition (1911–14) under Douglas Mawson who named this feature for King George V of the United Kingdom.

The segment of land between these lines of longitude is referred to as George V Land. Mertz Glacier is located in this area.
