= Folkestone Harbour =

Coordinates: 51.079475°N 1.189632°E

Port of Folkestone
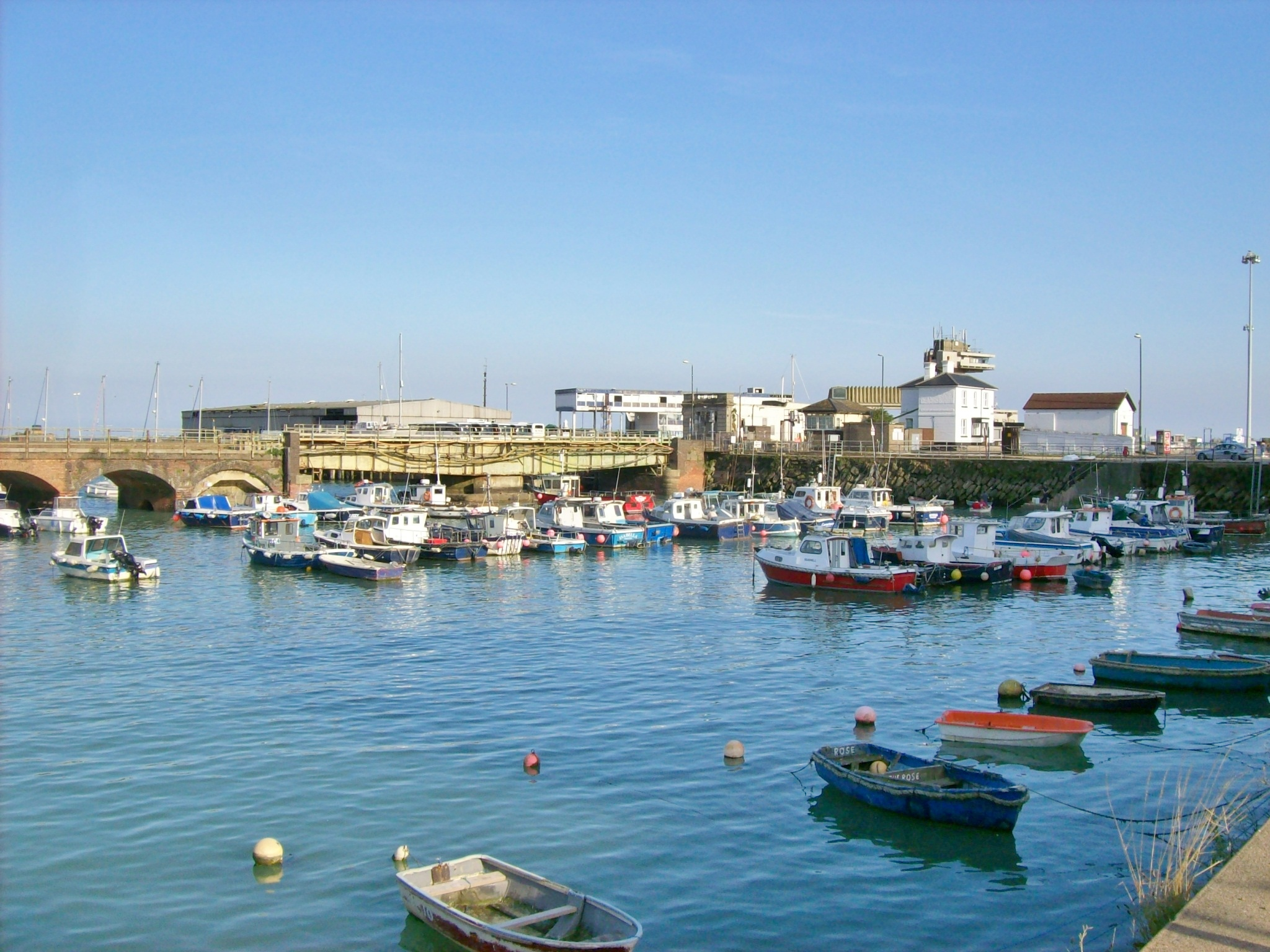
- Inner Harbour

Location
- Country: United Kingdom
- Location: Folkestone, Kent, England

Details
- Opened: 1807
- Owned by: The Folkestone Harbour Company
- Size: 35 acres (14 hectares)

Statistics
- Website; Folkestone Harbour

Folkestone Harbour is the main harbour of the town of Folkestone in Kent, England.

The harbour was developed during the 19th century, and became prominent after the South Eastern Railway (SER) began running boat trains to France. It was an important embarkation point for soldiers during both World Wars, and continued to be a popular traffic route for holidaymakers and goods traffic.

The opening of the Channel Tunnel in 1994, along with a reduction in the local fishing industry, caused the harbour to decline in importance. In the 21st century, it has been redeveloped into a centre for leisure and tourism.

== History ==
In 1541, King Henry VIII of England was about to wage a war against the French. A plan was made to use Folkestone as a port of embarkation to supplies and troops. He sent a Master Tuk and Master Captain of Sandgate to look for a site for the new harbour. Plans were made but never implemented. On 2 May 1542, the king came to Folkestone but then headed to Dover on 6 May. The Folkestone Harbour plan was abandoned.

In 1703, a heavy storm swept away one of the fishing boats on the shingle beach and damaged many other boats. Also several houses had their foundations undermined as the beach was carried away. An engineer from Romney Marsh advised the local fisherman that the construction of three timber/stone jetties would protect the cliff (below the parish church). The work cost the fishermen £600. But in a storm in 1724, the three jetties were demolished and damage costing up to £1,100 was done.

In 1790, Edward Hasted noted, 8-10 'luggerboats' (used for herring and mackerel fishing), plus 30 smaller fishing boats (catching plaice, sole, whiting, skate, and others) employed up to 200-300 men and boys. This fish was then taken up to the London markets.

It remained a small fishing community with a seafront that was continually battered by storms and the encroaching shingle made it hard to land boats. And the loss of life, boats and damage to fisherman's housing was a constant threat.

=== 19th-century development ===
In 1804, the Earl of Radnor had petitioned Parliament for the construction of a stone harbour. In 1807, an act of Parliament, the Folkestone Pier and Harbour Act 1807 (47 Geo. 3 Sess. 2. c. ii), was passed to build a pier and harbour, which was built by Thomas Telford in 1809. In 1810, the new harbour of local sandstone was complete. By 1820, a harbour area of 14 acres (5.7 hectares) had been enclosed. Folkestone's trade and population grew slightly but development was still hampered by sand and silt from the Pent Stream. The Folkestone Harbour Company invested heavily in removing the silt but with little success. In 1842, the company became bankrupt and the government put the derelict harbour up for sale. It was bought by the South Eastern Railway (SER), which was then building the London to Dover railway line, and from June 1843 was the base for a ferry service to Boulogne, after a successful trial by the steam packet Water Witch. George Turnbull was responsible in 1844 for building the Horn pier. Dredging the harbour, and the construction of a rail route down to it, began almost immediately, and the town soon became the SER's principal packet station for the Continental traffic to Boulogne.

In 1845, the Pavilion Hotel, designed by architect Sir William Cubitt was opened. The hotel was later visited by author Charles Dickens and Queen Victoria, then becoming known as the Royal Pavilion Hotel.

In 1849, the harbour was used by up to 49,000 passengers, and was being served by the Folkestone Harbour railway station, opened that year.

In 1860, the quay was built and a new fish market was opened on 2 August 1862.

During the 19th century, the harbour was importing coal, timber and ice, being unloaded in the inner harbour. Chalk (for lime burning) was being exported. Many of the ships in this export/import trade were registered in Folkestone.

At the end of the century the pier was extended by 900 feet (270 m) to form a sheltering arm with berths for steamers. A piled staging was constructed from the existing end of the pier from which grabs could operate to remove the silt. Diving bells were used to level up the hard rock, and then portland cement blocks of up to 20 tons weight were used to build the foundations. Above the low water line granite facings were used. As each section was completed the staging was removed and redeployed for the next section.

=== 20th century ===
During World War I, the harbour became a huge embarkation point for British troops heading to France and the Western Front. It was recorded that 10,463,834 military mailbags were handled. The harbour also handled 120,000 war refugees. In the 1920s, the sail ships had been replaced by steam ships, who were using the outer harbour. The inner harbour had then started being used by smaller private craft.

During World War II, the port closed to civilian boat usage and 44,000 personnel used the port during the Dunkirk Evacuation, filling up to eighty trains heading to London. In 1945, cargo services returned to the harbour and ferries went to Calais and Belgium. On 1 August 1946, the SS Auto Carrier started carrying cars to Boulogne. July 1947 the Folkestone-Boulogne service resumed after a winter break. Over 67,000 passengers had used the service.

In 1960, the services were very popular and were carrying over 800,000 passengers, 438 cars and 276 lorries or commercial vehicles. In 1971–2, a roll-on/roll-off ramp was built for two new ships, Hengist and Horsa. By 1972, the Folkestone to Boulogne, Calais and Ostend services were carrying up to 1,266,783 passengers, 913,160 cars, 5,633 commercial vehicles and 31,594 freight vehicles (lorries and trucks).

=== 21st century ===
In 2001, all ferry services stopped. During this time, the fishing industry was going through various changes and by 2002, only ten boats (with thirty men) were employed in the fishing industry.

In 2010 a plan was commissioned for the development of the harbour and seafront from architect Sir Terry Farrell and Partners, and outline planning permission was granted in summer 2013. Clearance of redundant and dilapidated buildings took place in 2014/15, and stonework and original steelwork on the harbour arm has been carefully restored so that the area can be opened up to the public as a new pier and promenade from the summer of 2015. Much of the former fairground site is being used for car parking and temporary recreational use whilst preparations continue for the rest of the development. An iconic building on site, the Trinity House Pilot Station that served as the harbours port tower was demolished in 2014.

A plan was developed by the Remembrance Line Association which is based on retaining the harbour railway and its station as a major heritage/tourist operation and 'Leaving for War' museum given the significance of the Folkestone Harbour Branch in both World Wars which is important to the Allied and Commonwealth nations. The harbour railway station, unused by regular trains since 2000, was redeveloped into a walkway resembling the High Line in New York.
