= Commonwealth Bay =

Bay in Antarctica

Coordinates: 66°54′S 142°40′E

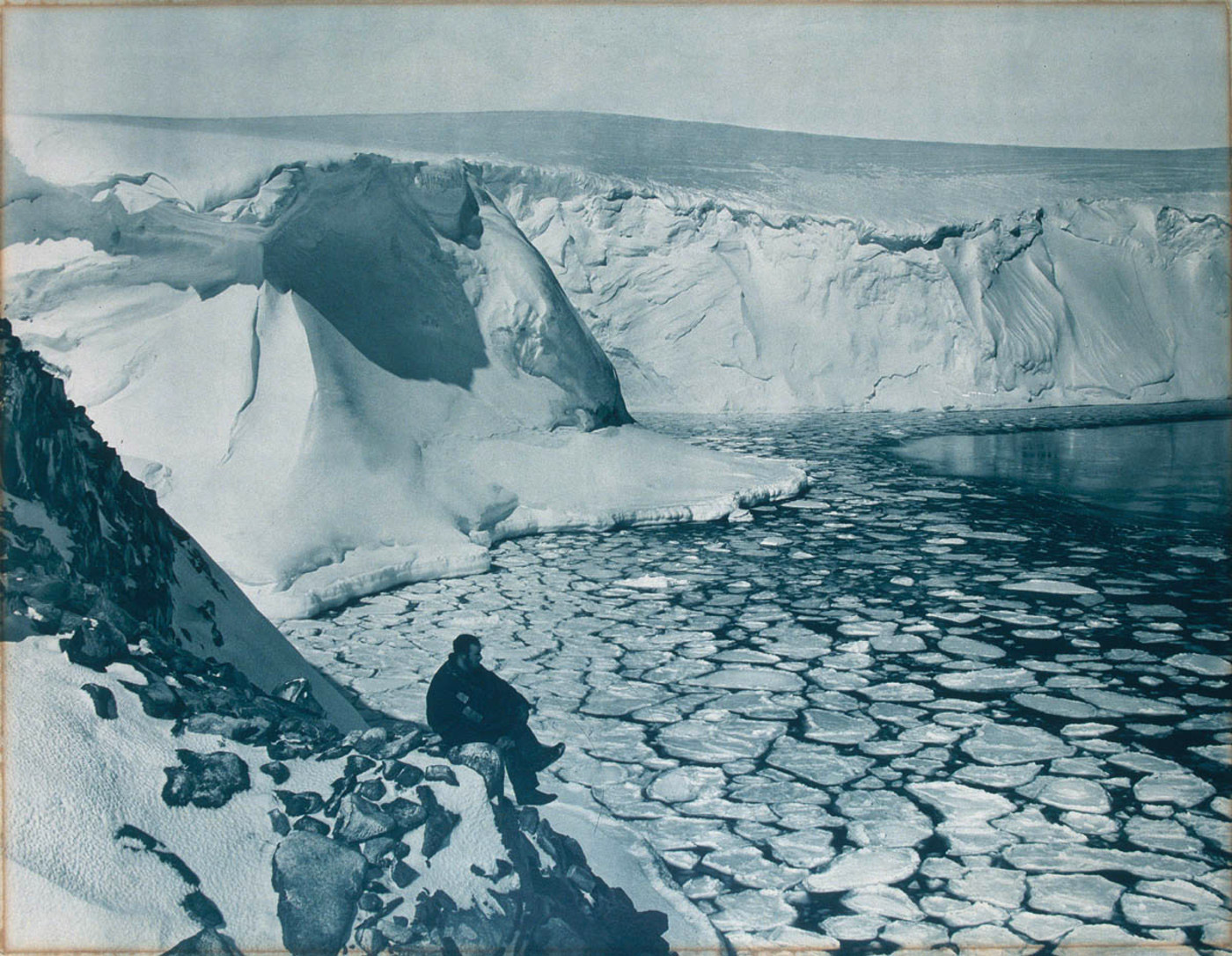
A photoprint of Commonwealth Bay, taken during the Australasian Antarctic Expedition in 1912.

Commonwealth Bay is an open bay about 48 km (30 mi) wide at the entrance between Point Alden and Cape Gray in Antarctica. It was discovered in 1912 by the Australasian Antarctic Expedition under Douglas Mawson, who established the main base of the expedition at Cape Denison at the head of the bay. The bay was named by the Expedition after the Commonwealth of Australia.

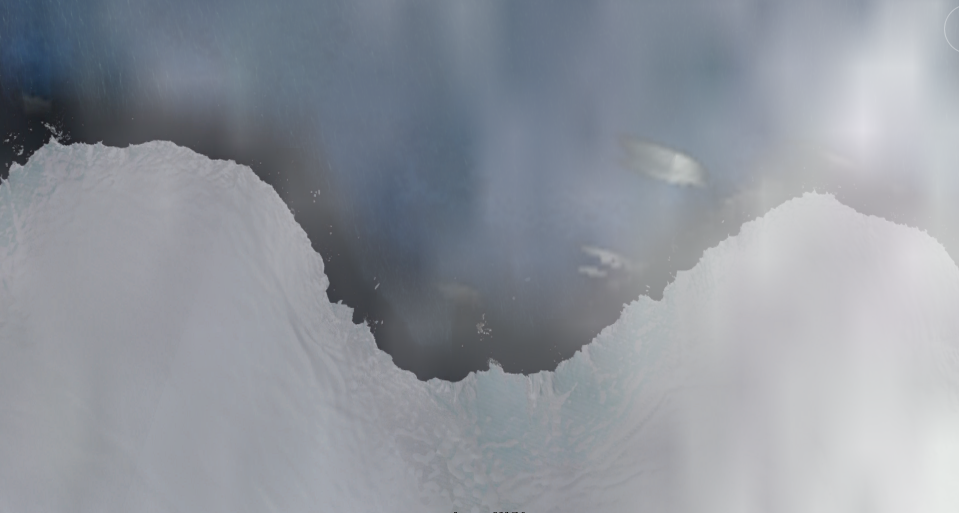
USGS satellite view of the Bay.

== Katabatic wind ==
Commonwealth Bay is listed in both the Guinness Book of World Records and the Eighth Edition of the National Geographic Atlas as the windiest place on Earth, with winds regularly exceeding 240 kilometres (150 mi) per hour and an average annual wind speed of 80 kilometres (50 mi) per hour.

Storms are caused by katabatic wind, a concentrated flow of cold air moving along the steep surface of the ice shield towards the sea. The air flow is accelerated by the increasing gradient of the surface of ice and the cliff monolith at Cape Denison. In the summer there are periods of relative calm, but in the winter storms are especially strong and long lasting, and can start and end unexpectedly. An abrupt start and end to a storm might be accompanied by powerful whirlpools, and by expressive short-lived and fast-moving clouds along the coast line.

Despite the extreme weather, the coast of the Bay is an important breeding area for Antarctic petrels, emperor penguins, and Adelie penguins, which are preyed on by leopard seals.

== Penguin population crash ==
From 2011 to 2016, the population of a colony of Adelie penguins living on the bay crashed from 160,000 to 10,000. A giant iceberg the size of Rome got stuck, leaving the colony effectively landlocked.
