= Index of Antarctica-related articles =

The location of Antarctica in the Southern Hemisphere

This is an alphabetical index of all articles related to the continent of Antarctica.

== 0–9 ==
- 70th parallel south
- 80th parallel south

== A ==
- Aboa (research station)
- Aeneas Mackintosh
- Amundsen's South Pole expedition
- Antarctica
- Antarctic Circle
- Antarctica Day
- Antarctic English
- Antarctic gateway cities
- Antarctic Peninsula
- Antarctic realm
- Antarctic krill
- Antarctic microorganisms
- Antarctic Treaty System
  - Secretariat of the Antarctic Treaty
- Argentine Antarctica

== B ==
- Bibliography of Antarctica
- Borceguí Island
- British Antarctic Survey
- British Antarctic Territory

== C ==
- Cannabis in Antarctica
- Carsten Borchgrevink
- Chapel of the Snows
- Climate of Antarctica
- Crime in Antarctica

== D ==
- Demographics of Antarctica
- Discovery Expedition

== E ==
- East Antarctica
- Emilio Palma
- Emperor penguin
- Ernest Joyce
- Ernest Shackleton

== F ==
- Fabian Gottlieb von Bellingshausen
- Far Eastern Party
- Farthest South
- Firefighting in Antarctica
- Flag of Antarctica
- Flora of Antarctica
- Food in Antarctica
- Football in Antarctica

== G ==
- Glacier
- Graham Land

== H ==
- Harry McNish

== I ==
- Ice shelf
- Imperial Trans-Antarctic Expedition

== J ==
- Japanese Antarctic Expedition

== K ==
- King Edward VII Land

== L ==
- Little Rockford
- List of islands in Antarcitca

== M ==
- McMurdo Station
- Mikhail Lazarev

== N ==
- New South Greenland
- Nimrod Expedition

== P ==
- Polar ecology
- Polar route
- Protocol on Environmental Protection to the Antarctic Treaty

== R ==
- Religion in Antarctica
- Research stations in Antarctica
- List of rivers of Antarctica
- Robert Falcon Scott
- Ross Ice Shelf
- Ross Island
- Ross Sea
- Ross Sea party

== S ==
- SY Aurora's drift
- Scottish National Antarctic Expedition
- Shackleton–Rowett Expedition
- South Pole
- Southern Cross Expedition

== T ==
- Telecommunications in Antarctica
- Terra Nova Expedition
- Territorial claims in Antarctica
- Time in Antarctica
- Tom Crean (explorer)
- Tourism in Antarctica
- Transantarctic Mountains

== U ==
- List of ultras of Antarctica

== V ==
- Victoria Land
- Voyage of the James Caird

== W ==
- West Antarctica
- Wildlife of Antarctica
- William Speirs Bruce
