= Icestock =

Outdoor music festival

Coordinates: 77°50′48″S 166°39′58″E

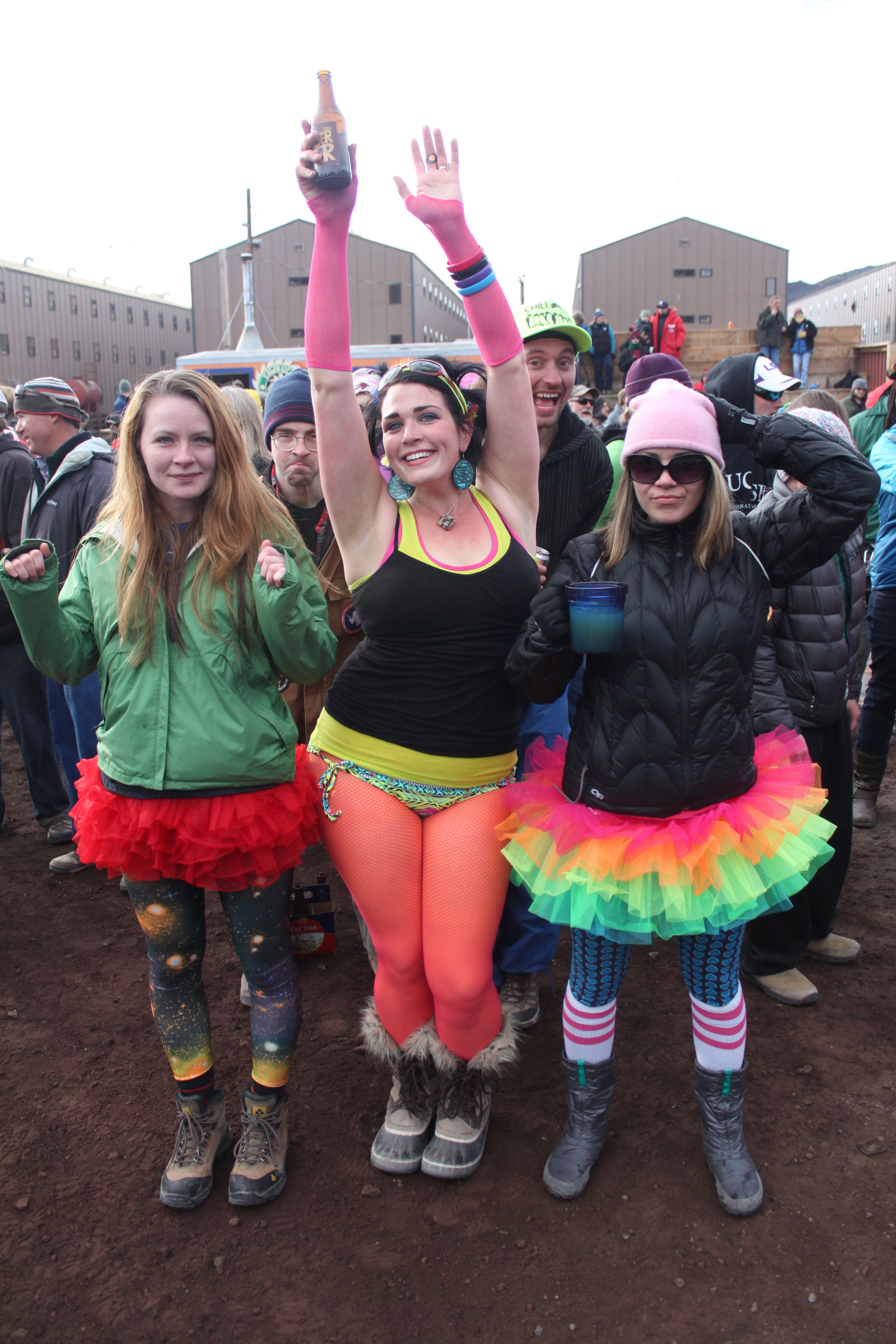
Attendees at the 2013 Icestock

Icestock is an all-day, outdoor music festival held annually at McMurdo Station, Antarctica on or around New Year's Day. It was started in 1989 by three United States Antarctic Program employees who wanted to host a music festival in the style of Woodstock. It is the southern-most music festival in the world.

== Overview ==
The organizers, performers, and attendees of Icestock are all personnel working at McMurdo or nearby Scott Base. Because of the restrictions of the station's working schedule, Icestock falls on the Saturday closest to New Year's Day. Ahead of the event, volunteers erect a temporary stage as well as shacks for serving food and beverages.

Anyone who is interested may perform in Icestock. Around a dozen acts perform each year, and the performances last for several hours. People often attend in costume. The celebration culminates with a countdown to the new year. Because it occurs during the Antarctic summer, the entire festival, including the midnight countdown, takes place in sunlight.

== Musical acts ==
There are both group and individual musical performances at Icestock. As there are no permanent residents of Antarctica, musical groups typically form in the weeks preceding the festival. All personnel at the station are employed in other capacities, so music rehearsal takes place outside of the station's 54-hour work week. McMurdo has practice rooms and some instruments, but many musicians bring their own equipment to the station.

Musicians perform both original music and covers from a wide variety of genres, including folk, rock, and dance music. Although there have been attempts to record Icestock performances, the music from Icestock is rarely performed or distributed beyond the festival.

== Other activities ==
In addition to music, performances at Icestock have included comedy sketch routines, dramatic performances, and dance routines. Most years people dressed as Baby New Year will take the stage around midnight.

A chili cook-off also forms a central part of Icestock activities.
