= Antarctic English =

Variety of the English language

- Native to: Antarctica
- Language family: Indo-European: Germanic; West Germanic; North Sea Germanic; Anglo-Frisian; Anglic; English; Antarctic English
- Early forms: Proto-Indo-European: Proto-Germanic; Proto-West Germanic; Proto-English; Old English; Middle English; Early Modern English; Modern English
- Writing system: Latin (English alphabet)

Language codes
- ISO 639-3: –

Antarctic English is a variety of the English language spoken by people living on the continent of Antarctica and within the subantarctic islands. Spoken primarily by scientists and workers in the Antarctic tourism industry, it consists of various unique words and is spoken with a unique accent. During the 19th and 20th centuries, Antarctic English was influenced by Spanish-speaking South Americans and Northern European explorers who introduced new words that continue to be used today.

== Accent ==
An Antarctic accent was first reported in 2019 in the Journal of the Acoustical Society of America, in a study in which researchers observed changes in the vocal phonetics of scientists over the course of a winter period in Antarctica. They observed a change in vowel pronunciation in the scientists, and vowels such as that in "food" and the second in "window" began being pronounced in a more fronted position of the mouth than in other English varieties. The changes are very slight; the lead researcher said "You can't hear the differences very well because they are so small, but you can measure them."

== Vocabulary ==
In 1989, Australian writer Bernadette Hince travelled to Antarctica in order to study the vocabulary of scientists working there. She wrote about a variety of unique words that originated on the continent and were not used anywhere else. In 2000, she published the Antarctic Dictionary.

Antarctic English features various words that are different from other varieties of English. Occurrences of new vocabulary include:

Example Antarctic English terms
British English	Antarctic English
Antarctica	The Ice
Home-made beer	Homer
Insomnia	Big Eye
To pick up rubbish	Fod plod
Clear day with blue skies	Dingle day
Researcher staying for the winter	Winterer
A tea or coffee break	Smoko

Antarctic English also has several words for different types of ice. Words include tabulars (large flat-topped southern icebergs that break off from the Antarctic ice sheet and are usually over 16 km or 10 mi long), and growlers (underwater decaying icebergs roughly the size of a house).

The tourism industry has terms for different types of tourist encounters, such as Kodak poisoning (what happens when many tourists take photographs of the same site) and Dead-Penguin Tours (a type of tour in the late summer after penguins have abandoned weak chicks to die, leaving their bodies in popular tourist destinations, which causes grief in tourists).

Antarctic English has been influenced by both Spanish and various Northern European languages. In the Falkland Islands, Antarctic English has been influenced by Spanish-speaking South Americans, such as with the word camp, which originates from the Spanish campo and refers to the countryside outside of a town. During the 18th and 19th centuries, Northern European industrialists interested in whaling and the fur trade introduced various technical words like the Norwegian-origin grax, which describes the leftover solids at the end of the whaling process. Other words introduced by these Europeans during the 19th and 20th centuries included nunatak, mukluk, pemmican, and Nansen sled, which they in turn adopted from various indigenous American languages. Some terms in Antarctic English have their origins in military terminology.

Antarctic English has also influenced other varieties of English. A number of English terms were first adopted in Antarctica (particularly terms relating to ice).
