= Elections in Antarctica =

Elections in Antarctica are held by countries which have set up research stations in the continent, allowing their staff to vote while stationed outside their home countries. Since Antarctica has no permanent population nor a locally elected government, these elections are held under overseas electoral precincts which allow non-resident citizen voting. However, among the nations with territorial claims in Antarctica, some have held elections in the continent by treating their claims as constituent subdivisions of their territory.

The political status of Antarctica is regulated by the 1959 Antarctic Treaty and other related agreements, collectively called the Antarctic Treaty System. Such treaty establishes that Antarctica is a condominium—over which none of its signatory countries has sovereignty—while all human activity in the continent is restricted by peaceful purposes. Therefore, under the terms of the treaty, every country which holds elections in Antarctica does so outside its territory.

While the Antarctic Treaty does not explicitly mention elections in Antarctic soil, some of its member states—namely, Argentina and Chile—have established Electoral precincts in Antarctica as a form of asserting their territorial claims. On this issue, the Antarctic Treaty states that none of its member states can make territorial claims after its signature. Therefore, all territorial claims in the continent predate the treaty and are only recognized between some of its claiming nations.

Among those nations, Argentina and Chile assert their claims in Antarctica by affirming them to be integral parts of their national territories, even though such stance is not internationally recognized by the Antarctic Treaty. Such countries are the only ones that have built civilian settlements in Antarctica—Esperanza Base and Villa Las Estrellas, respectively—and have established de jure administrative subdivisions covering their territorial claims. Argentina, for instance, claims Argentine Antarctica as a department of its province of Tierra del Fuego, Antarctica and South Atlantic Islands—while Chile claims the Chilean Antarctic Territory as a commune of its Antártica Chilena Province. In order to uphold their claims, Argentina and Chile hold elections in their Antarctic settlements under their own electoral precincts, which are treated as national subdivisions in their electoral divisions, results and maps.

Meanwhile, Australia and New Zealand conduct elections for their citizens in Antarctica by assigning ballots corresponding to their voters' electorate in their resident constituencies.

== Countries which hold elections in Antarctica ==
Results of the second round of the 2023 Argentine presidential election, in which winning candidate Javier Milei carried the Argentine Antarctica division with 90.57% of the vote.

=== Argentina ===
Elections in Argentina are held in Antarctica under its Argentine Antarctica division, which is a de jure department of the province of Tierra del Fuego, Antarctica and South Atlantic Islands. Argentine Antarctica is home to Esperanza Base, the only Argentinian civilian settlement in Antarctica, where a polling station is set during elections for Argentinian voters. In the second round of the 2023 Argentine presidential election, the winning candidate Javier Milei won 90.57% of the votes of the stationed personnel in Antarctica.

=== Australia ===
Australia has held elections in Antarctica since 1984, when legislative changes allowed the transmission of federal election votes from Antarctica by "radio-telephone or telex". At Australian research bases in the continent, elections are conducted by two volunteers from each station, who are appointed as Antarctic Returning Officer and Assistant by the Australian Electoral Commission (AEC). Based on its list of registered Antarctic electors, the AEC emails the ballot papers for each voter's electorate in Australia to the station's Returning Officer. The ballot papers are printed and cast by voters into a locked metal box, in order to maintain voter secrecy. After the polls close, the Returning Officers open the box and read the ballot papers over a telephone call to an AEC official in Hobart, Tasmania, who transcribes them for inclusion in the vote count.

Results of the first round of the 2025 Chilean presidential election, in which José Antonio Kast won 45.45% of the vote in the Antártica commune.

=== Chile ===
Elections in Chile are held in Antarctica under its Antártica division, which is a de jure communne of the Antártica Chilena Province. During elections, polling stations are set up at Villa Las Estrellas, the only Chilean civilian settlement in Antarctica. In the first round of the 2025 Chilean presidential election, the winning candidate José Antonio Kast won 45.45% of the votes in the Antártica commune.

=== New Zealand ===
Voting is open to all eligible New Zealanders in Antarctica, who are mainly stationed at Scott Base and nearby McMurdo Station, the latter owned by the United States. During elections, voting papers are flown in to Scott Base and are later returned to New Zealand in time for the official count.

== See also ==
- Elections in Argentina
- Elections in Australia
- Elections in Chile
- Elections in New Zealand
