= Football in Antarctica =

Association football has been played in Antarctica since the early twentieth century. The sport was first played in Antarctica by the British and was later played by South Americans and other nationalities.

== History ==
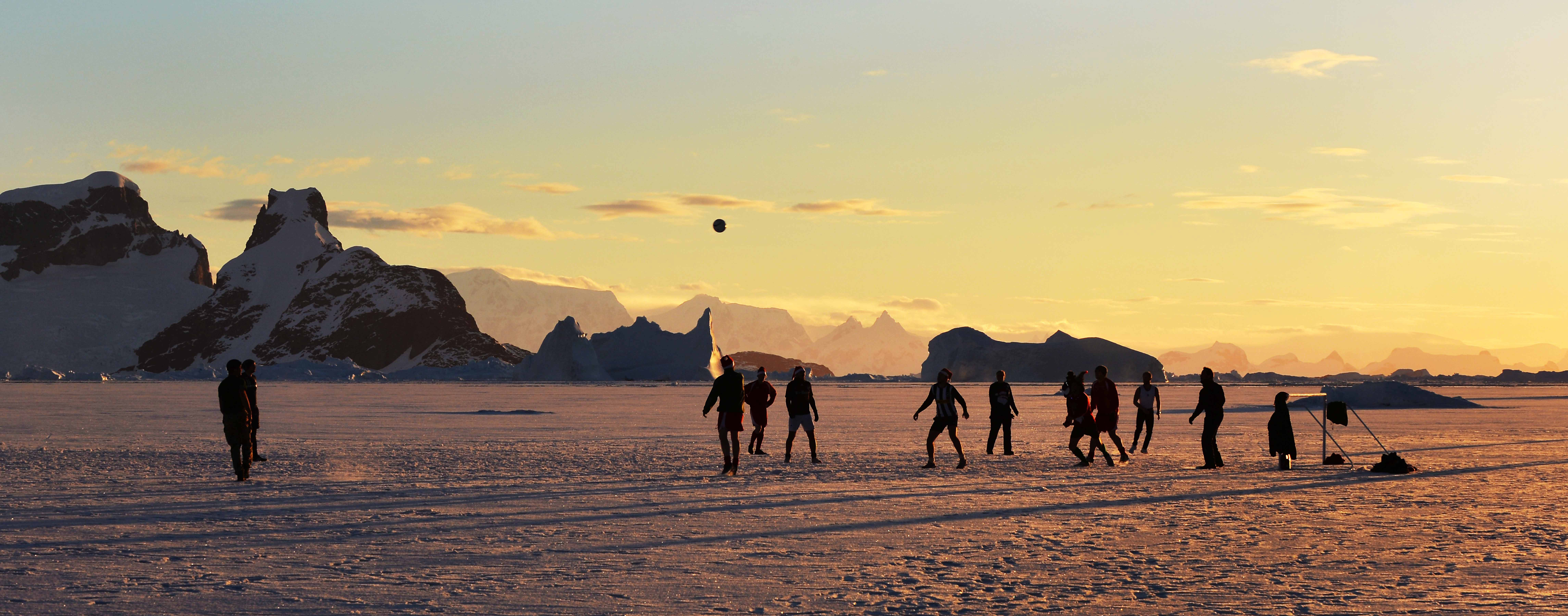
Crewmembers of the HMS Protector playing football in Antarctica (2013).

The earliest record of football on Antarctica was by the British National Antarctic Expedition in 1902. Matches in the 1910s were described by explorers Robert Falcon Scott and Ernest Shackleton. On February 5, 1948, a match was played between a British vessel, HMS Snipe, and an Argentinian ship, ARA Seaver, on Deception Island. The match was suggested by the United States Department of State after the two countries had disputed the ownership of Station G, a deactivated British base. HMS Snipe won 1–0. On February 12, 1949, British and Chilean teams played a match on Deception Island and drew 1–1.

In 1971, the Argentinian Esperanza Base hosted the first international tournament on Antarctica, which was six-a-side. The first match between two bases was between Esperanza and Chile's Bernardo O'Higgins Base, which Esperanza won 7–3. On 19 January 1986, Chile's Teniente Marsh Air Base drew 2–2 with Uruguay's Artigas Base. In 1988, the 'Inter-Bases Championship' was held, featuring teams from Uruguayan, Chilean, Soviet and Chinese stations. The Uruguayan base, Artigas, won the title.

On February 16, 2006, teams of Spanish and Bulgarians in Antarctica played a match, with CSKA Sofia notably providing their official jerseys to the Bulgarians. The match ended 6–6. In 2011, the American McMurdo Station defeated the British Rothera Research Station 1–0.

Possibly the southernmost football game ever was played in 2015, with a team of Chilean soldiers and scientists facing employees of an Antarctic tourism camp. The match was played at Union Glacier, around 1,000 kilometers from the South Pole, and the Chilean team won 2–1. Also in 2015, David Beckham played a match on Antarctica with two teams of international explorers and guides.

Matches continue to be played involving bases and visiting ships, with Rothera often hosting fixtures. An official Antarctica national football team, however, has never existed.

== South Georgia and the South Sandwich Islands ==
Football has also been played in the nearby British territory of South Georgia and the South Sandwich Islands. According to Eduardo Triunfo, a Uruguayan whaling station worker, football was played between Uruguayan workers and Norwegian whale hunters in the 1940s, as well as with the British SS Queen of Bermuda ship.

Games have more recently been played by a King Edward Point research station team, mostly against visiting ships. In 2009, King Edward Point defeated Rothera 5–0.
