= T. H. Baughman =

American historian

T. H. (Tim) Baughman (born 1947) teaches European and polar exploration history at the University of Maryland Eastern Shore. He graduated with a bachelor's degree from Stetson University in 1968. M.A. from The Ohio State University; Ph.D. from Florida State University. He is a professor emeritus at the University of Central Oklahoma where he was Dean of the College of Liberal Arts from 2000 to 2004

He is the author of several books and articles on polar exploration and lectures widely on European and polar history and a frequent leader of international expeditions for Zegrahm Expeditions.

== Selected publications ==
- Before the Heroes Came: Antarctica in the 1890s (University of Nebraska Press, 1994)
- Ice: The Antarctic Diary of Charles F. Passel (Texas Tech University Press, 1995)
- Pilgrims on the Ice: Robert Falcon Scott's First Antarctic Expedition (University of Nebraska Press, 1999)
- Shackleton of the Antarctic (University of Nebraska Press, 2008)
- History of Western Civilization Kindle Edition (Amazon Digital, 2012)
- Ages and Stages: Biographical Vignettes Kindle Edition (Amazon Digital, 2017)
