= McDonald Beach =

Beach in Antarctica

Coordinates: 77°15′S 166°22′E

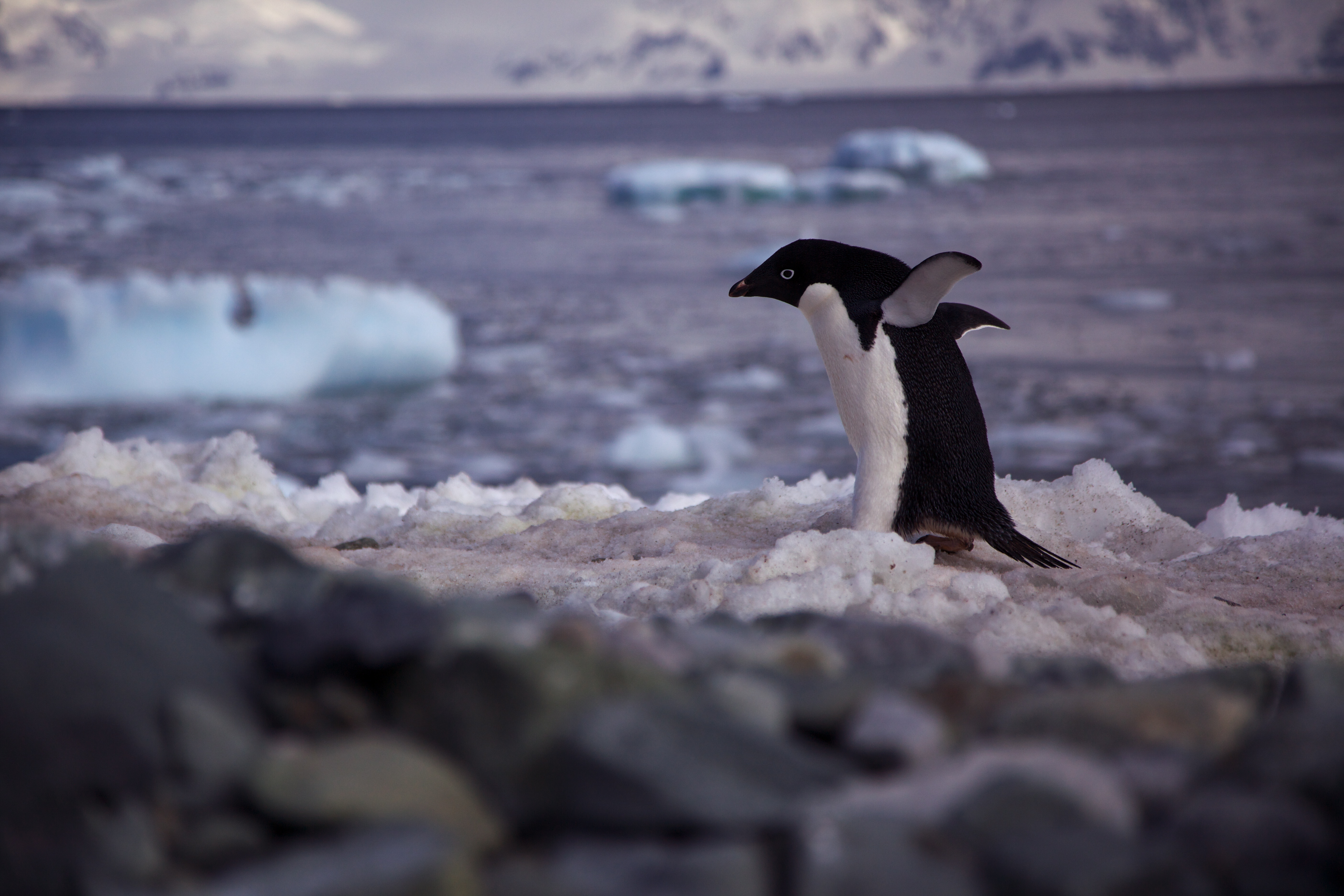
Adélie penguins breed in the IBA

McDonald Beach is an extensive beach lying west of Inclusion Hill and 6 nautical miles (11 km) southwest of Cape Bird on Ross Island, Antarctica. It was named by the New Zealand Geological Survey Antarctic Expedition (NZGSAE), 1958–59, after Captain Edwin A. McDonald, then Deputy Commander, US Naval Support Force, Antarctica, who provided extensive transport and other facilities to the NZGSAE in support of the survey of the Cape Bird area.

== Important Bird Area ==
A 269 ha site comprising all the ice-free ground at the beach has been designated an Important Bird Area (IBA) by BirdLife International because it supports about 43,000 breeding pairs of Adélie penguins – the mean total count over 30 seasons between 1981 and 2012.
