= Alaskozetes antarcticus =

Scientific classification
- Kingdom: Animalia
- Phylum: Arthropoda
- Subphylum: Chelicerata
- Class: Arachnida
- Order: Oribatida
- Family: Ameronothridae
- Genus: Alaskozetes
- Species: A. antarcticus

Binomial name
- Alaskozetes antarcticus (Michael, 1903)

Species of arachnid

Alaskozetes antarcticus is a species of non-parasitic mite, known for its ability to survive in subzero temperatures.

This animal's name derives from its habitat: Alasko, meaning "from Alaska", and antarcticus, in connection with frigid conditions in which the mite lives. Scientists are unclear as to how Alaskozetes antarcticus has been able to adapt to an environment so different from those of other arthropods. Whereas most arthropod species inhabit hot, moist environments, A. antarcticus survives in freezing conditions with almost no humidity.

There are three subspecies: Alaskozetes antarcticus antarcticus, Alaskozetes antarcticus grandjeani, and Alaskozetes antarcticus intermedius.

== Diet ==
Alaskozetes antarcticus eats moss, algae and fungi. These mites are not parasitic and do not suck blood. They are harmless to humans and large organisms.
