= Eric Rignot =

American scientist

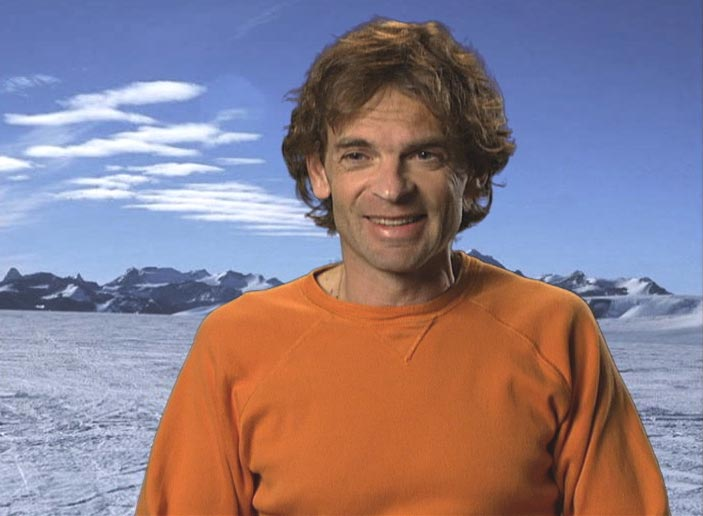
- Dr. Eric Rignot
- Born: 8 December 1961 (age 64); France
- Education: École Centrale Paris; University of Paris VI Pierre et Marie Curie; University of Southern California
- Occupations: Professor, Earth system science at the University of California, Irvine
- Known for: Senior Research Scientist for the Radar Science and Engineering Section at NASA’s Jet Propulsion Laboratory

Eric J. Rignot is the Donald Bren, Distinguished and Chancellor Professor of Earth system science at the University of California, Irvine, and a Senior Research Scientist for the Radar Science and Engineering Section at NASA's Jet Propulsion Laboratory. He studies the interaction of the polar ice sheets in Greenland and Antarctica with global climate using a combination of satellite remote sensing (synthetic-aperture radar interferometry), airborne remote sensing (depth sounding radar, gravity), understanding of physical processes controlling glacier flow and ice melt in the ocean, field methods (multibeam echo sounding, CTD, AWS), and climate modeling (ISSM, MITgcm). He was elected at the National Academy of Sciences in 2018.

== Education ==
Rignot had elementary school in Le Chambon-sur-Lignon, France where he was born in 1961 and completed his French Baccalaureat at Le Collège-Lycée Cévenol International in 1979. In 1985, Rignot studied an engineering degree at the École Centrale des Arts et Manufactures, Paris, France, where he took classes in physics, chemistry, math, and economics. After a year, he took Master of Science in astronomy at the University of Paris VI Pierre et Marie Curie, Paris, France. In 1987 and 1988 he took Master of Science in Electrical Engineering and Master of Science in Aerospace Engineering, consecutively, in the University of Southern California. It is also in the University of Southern California where he pursued Doctor of Philosophy in Electrical Engineering in 1991.

== Work ==
He is a principal investigator on several NASA-funded projects to study the mass balance of the Greenland ice sheets and Antarctic ice sheets by using radar interferometry and other methods; the interactions of ice shelves with the ocean; and the dynamic retreat of Patagonian glaciers. In particular, Rignot's primary research interests are glaciology, climate change, radar remote sensing, ice sheet numerical modeling, interferometric synthetic-aperture radar, radio echo sounding, and ice-ocean interactions. His research group focuses on understanding the interactions of ice and climate, ice sheet mass balance, ice-ocean interactions in Greenland and Antarctica, and current/future contributions of ice sheets to sea level change.

He was a member of NASA's Program for Arctic Regional Climate Assessment (PARCA) since its inception in 1993 to unravel for the first time the mass budget of the Greenland Ice Sheet. He participated in the first deployment of a NASA airborne survey of the Amundsen Sea Embayment sector of West Antarctica in Fall 2002 in collaboration with the Chilean Navy. He was the Science Lead for land ice of the NASA airborne mission Operation IceBridge which provide comprehensive and repeat surveys of Greenland and Antarctica for thickness, elevation, and gravity between 2009 and 2019. He was the Deputy Lead of NASA's Earth Venture Mission "Ocean Melting Greenland" (OMG) from 2015 to 2020 to survey the fjords of Greenland and the ocean temperature and salinity of the coastal waters around Greenland for the first time. Since 2007 until present and at least 2028, he led the NASA MEaSUREs program to generate Earth Science Data Record of Ice Motion and Grounding Lines in Antarctica.

In 2007 he contributed to the IPCC Fourth Assessment Report WGI (Working Group I) which was awarded the Nobel Peace Prize in the name of all authors and co-authors, along with VP Al Gore.

In 2014, he was a Lead Author of the IPCC Fifth Assessment Report WGI (Working Group I).

== Awards ==
Rignot has received several awards and honors during his career.

- Member of the National Academy of Engineering (2025)
- Fellow of American Association for the Advancement of Science (2019)
- Member of National Academy of Sciences, USA (2018)
- Louis Agassiz Medal of the European Geosciences Union (2017)
- Fellow of American Geophysical Union (2013)
- NASA Outstanding Leadership Medal (2012)
- NASA Group Achievement Award, IceBridge Mission (2011)
- NASA Group Achievement Award, Ice Sheet System Model (2011)
- National Science Foundation's Antarctic Service Medal (2009)
- NASA Group Achievement Award, Warm Ice Sounding Explorer Team (2009)
- Bowie Lecture, American Geophysical Union (2008)
- NASA Exceptional Scientific Achievement Medal (2007)
- NASA JPL Edward Stone Award for Outstanding Research Publication (2004)
- NASA JPL Level A Award for Technical Achievement (2004)
- NASA Exceptional Scientific Achievement Medal (2003)
- Nomination of ”Rignot Glacier, Antarctica” by U. S. Board Geogr. Names (2003)
- NASA JPL Edward Stone Award for Outstanding Research Publication (2002)
- NASA JPL Lew Allen Award for Excellence (1998)
- Prize Paper Award IEEE Geos. Rem. Sens. Soc. (1994)

== Publications ==
An overview of Rignot's research publications can be obtained via his Google Scholar profile.

Based on study findings, he noted that the observed speed at which glaciers in Greenland are melting is considerably faster than he had anticipated. In 2014 Rignot was the lead author on a widely publicized study which based on grounding line retreat, found that the melting of glaciers in the Amundsen Sea appears to be unstoppable. Rignot said that these glaciers have "passed the point of no return."

== See also ==
- Operation IceBridge
- Ocean Melting Greenland
- Sea level rise
- Thwaites Glacier
- Pine Island Glacier
- Marie Byrd Land
