= Sif Island =

Antarctic island

Geography
- Location: Pine Island Bay, Antarctica
- Coordinates: 75.098611°S 102.818056°W
- Length: 350 m (1150 ft)

Administration
- Administered under the Antarctic Treaty System

Demographics
- Population: 0

Sif Island is an island in Pine Island Bay of the Amundsen Sea, in Antarctica. It is 1,150 feet (350 m) long and consists of potassium feldspar granite, mostly covered in ice. It was discovered in February 2020 after the Pine Island Glacier melted away from around it, and is named after Sif, an Æsir goddess associated with the Earth in Norse mythology. It is plausible that the island emerged as a result of post-glacial rebound, a process in which retreating glaciers relieve pressure on the ground, causing it to rise.

== History ==
The steady retreat of the Pine Island Glacier and Thwaites Glacier since the early 2010s had left Sif Island separate from glacier ice in the Pine Island Bay, completely detaching in 2014 as seen in Landsat satellite imagery. The island may now be undergoing post-glacial rebound.

Sif Island was discovered in February 2020 by researchers with the Thwaites Glacier Offshore Research (THOR) project, aboard the Nathaniel B. Palmer research vessel. On February 11, 2020, marine geologist and crew member Julia Wellner announced the island's discovery via Twitter, stating that a crew member aboard the ship had spotted the rocky outcropping of granite, visible beneath a 'mushroom' of remnant ice. As ships rarely pass as far south as Sif Island, it is likely that the researchers aboard the Nathaniel B. Palmer are the first people to have seen the island and landed upon its granite bedrock. Despite the island being visible by satellite, its icy cap prevented it from being discovered earlier, as it blended in with the surrounding glacier.

On February 23, photos of the researchers' first landing on the island were posted by Wellner on her Twitter account. She confirmed that the island is made of granite, covered with residual ice, and home to a few seals.
