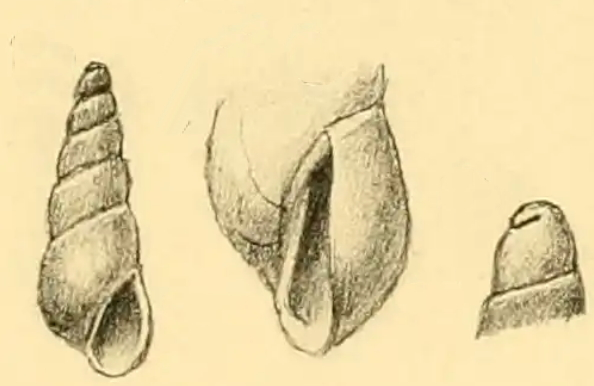
- Shell of Melanella antarctica (original drawing)

Scientific classification
- Kingdom: Animalia
- Phylum: Mollusca
- Class: Gastropoda
- Subclass: Caenogastropoda
- Order: Littorinimorpha
- Family: Eulimidae
- Genus: Melanella
- Species: M. antarctica

Binomial name
- Melanella antarctica (Strebel, 1908)

Synonyms
- Eulima antarctica Strebel, 1908

= Melanella antarctica =

Species of gastropod

Melanella antarctica is a species of sea snail, a marine gastropod mollusk in the family Eulimidae. The species is one of many species known to exist within the genus, Melanella.

== Distribution ==
This species occurs in Antarctic waters, these would include the Amundsen Sea, Bellingshausen Sea, Weddell Sea and the Ross Sea respectively.

== Description ==
The maximum recorded shell length is 4 mm.

(Original description in German) The slender shell is white, becoming somewhat more yellowish toward the apex, and is fairly glossy. It consists of six only slightly convex whorls, which are separated by a suture bordered by a sharply defined, pure-white line. The upper half of the body whorl is nearly flat or slightly concave; below this, the whorl expands somewhat and becomes slightly sac-like.

The columellar fold is appressed, while the columella itself is slightly curved outward and lies obliquely to the axis. Inferiorly, it passes somewhat angularly into the basal margin. The sculpture consists of distinct, isolated growth lines, which evidently correspond to successive stages in the shell’s growth.

== Habitat ==
Minimum recorded depth is 102 m. Maximum recorded depth is 489 m.
