= Thwaites Glacier =

Antarctic glacier

- "Doomsday Glacier"
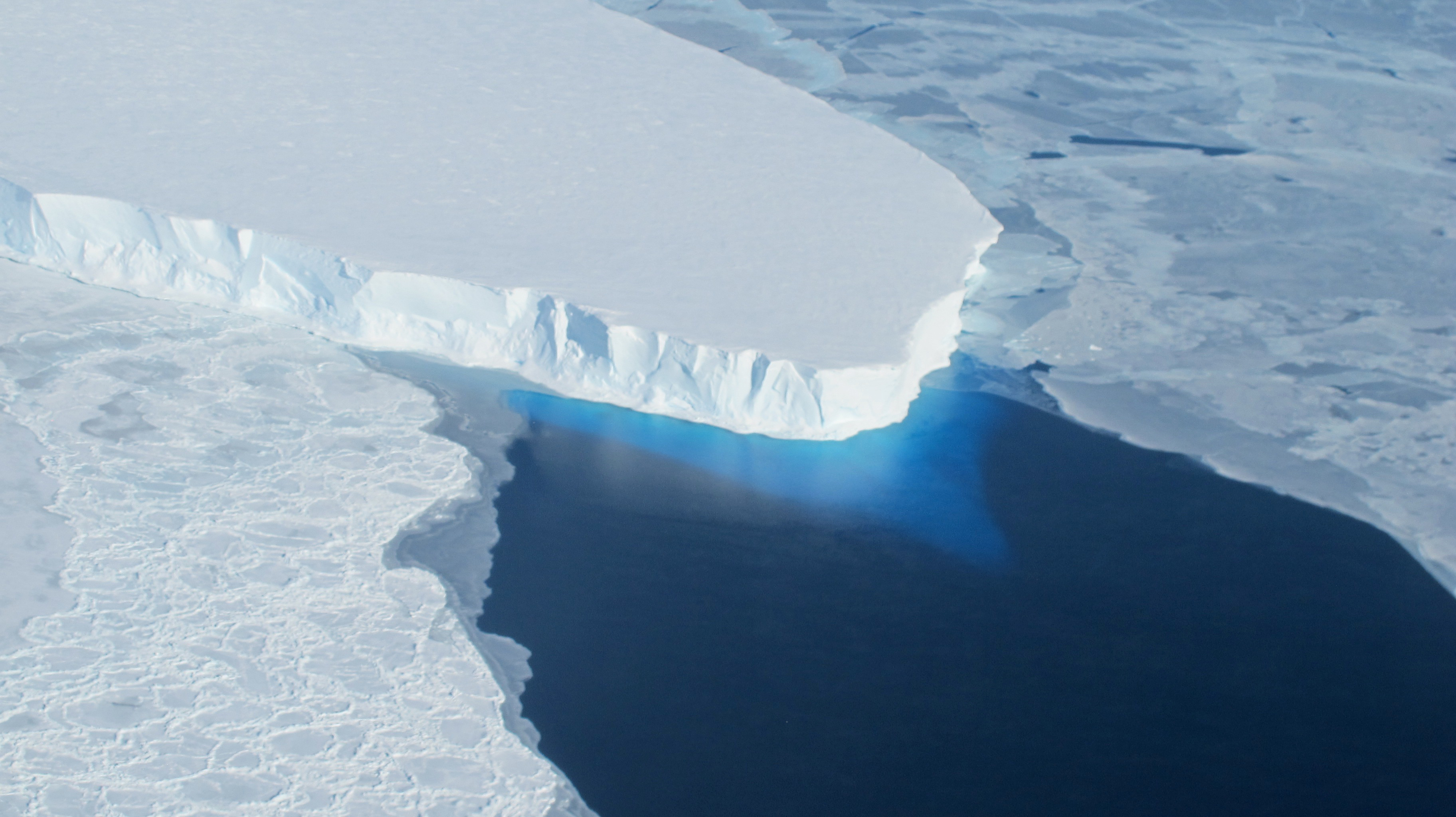
- Thwaites Glacier

- Location within Antarctica
- Type: Tidewater valley
- Location: Walgreen Coast, Marie Byrd Land, Antarctic
- Area: 192,000 km^{2} (74,000 sq mi)
- Width: 120 km (75 mi)
- Thickness: 800–1,200 m (0.50–0.75 mi)
- Lowest elevation: Below sea level
- Terminus: Pine Island Bay, part of the Amundsen Sea
- Status: Receding

Thwaites Glacier is an unusually broad and vast Antarctic glacier located east of Mount Murphy, on the Walgreen Coast of Marie Byrd Land. It was initially sighted by polar researchers in 1940, mapped in 1959–1966 and officially named in 1967, after the late American glaciologist Fredrik T. Thwaites. The glacier flows into Pine Island Bay, part of the Amundsen Sea, at surface speeds which exceed 2 kilometres (1.2 mi) per year near its grounding line. Its fastest-flowing grounded ice is centered between 50 and 100 kilometres (31 and 62 mi) east of Mount Murphy. Like many other parts of the cryosphere, it has been adversely affected by climate change, and provides one of the more notable examples of the retreat of glaciers since 1850.

Thwaites Glacier is closely monitored for its potential to elevate sea levels. Since the 1980s, Thwaites and Pine Island Glacier have been described as part of the "weak underbelly" of the West Antarctic Ice Sheet, in part because they seem vulnerable to irreversible retreat and collapse even under relatively little warming, but mainly because if they go, the entire ice sheet is likely to eventually follow. This hypothesis is based on both theoretical studies of the stability of marine ice sheets and observations of large changes on these two glaciers. In recent years, the flow of both of these glaciers has accelerated, their surfaces have lowered, and their grounding lines have retreated. They are believed very likely to eventually collapse without any further warming. The outsized danger Thwaites poses has led to some reporters nicknaming it the Doomsday Glacier, although this nickname is controversial among scientists.

The Thwaites Ice Shelf, a floating ice shelf which braces and restrains the eastern portion of Thwaites Glacier, is likely to collapse within a decade from 2021. The glacier's outflow is likely to accelerate substantially after the shelf's disappearance; while the outflow currently accounts for 4% of global sea level rise, it would quickly reach 5%, before accelerating further. The amount of ice from Thwaites likely to be lost in this century will only amount to several centimetres of sea level rise, but its breakdown will rapidly accelerate in the 22nd and 23rd centuries, and the volume of ice contained in the entire glacier can ultimately contribute 65 cm (25 1/2 in) to global sea level rise, which is more than twice the total sea level rise to date. Some researchers have proposed engineering interventions to stabilize the glacier, but they are costly and their success remains uncertain.

== Location and features ==
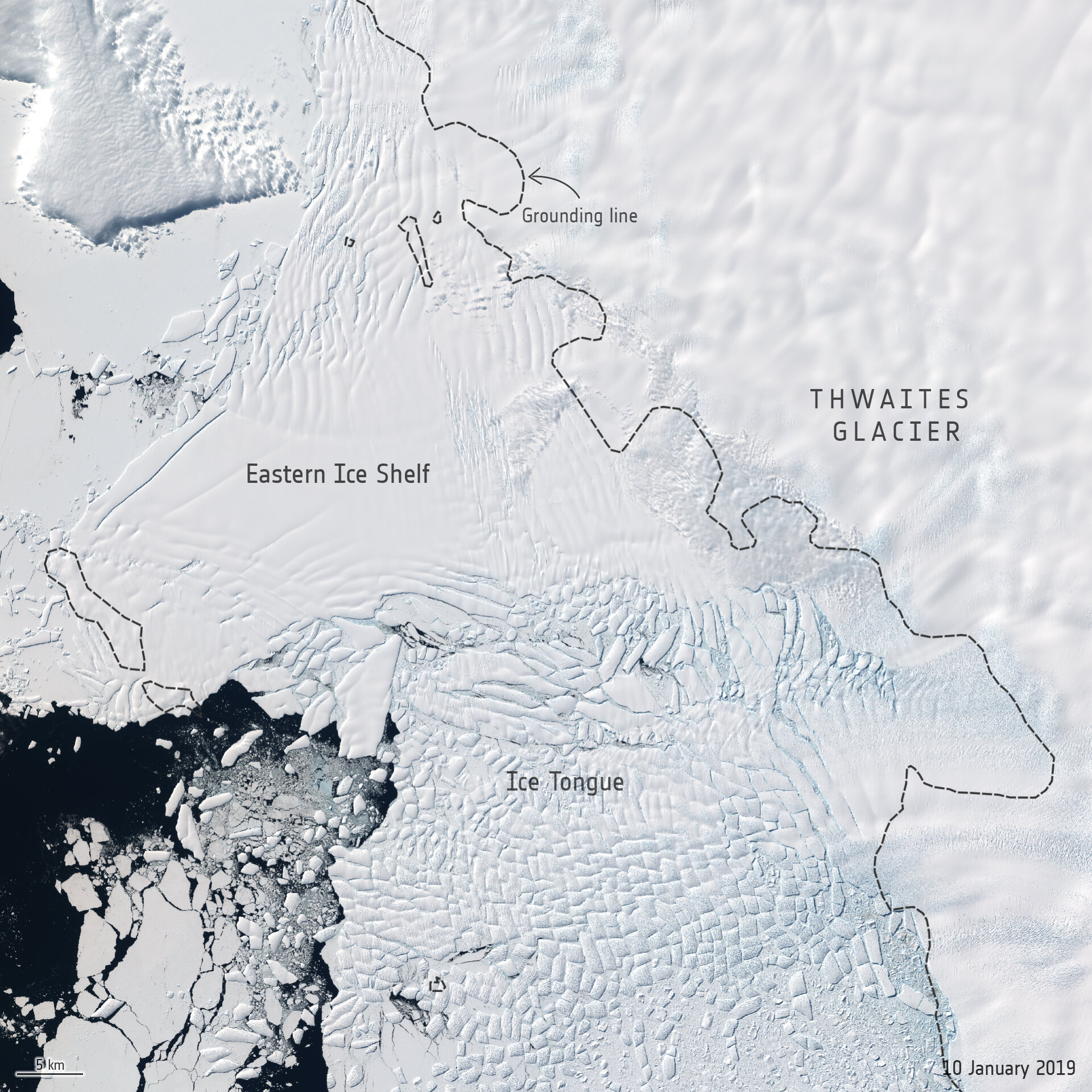
Photo taken in 2019 by the Sentinel-2 satellite of the European Space Agency. It shows the glacier, the ice shelf on its eastern side, and the remains of the ice tongue in the west, now reduced to a "mélange" of icebergs which is much less effective at supporting the glacier and preventing calving events.

Thwaites Glacier is located at the northern edge of the West Antarctic Ice Sheet, next to Pine Island Glacier. Both glaciers continually shed ice from their grounding line into Pine Island Bay, which is part of the Amundsen Sea. The fastest flows of ice occur between 50 and 100 kilometres (31 and 62 mi) east of Mount Murphy, where they can exceed 2 kilometres (1.2 mi) per year. At 120 km (75 mi) in width, Thwaites Glacier is the single widest glacier in the world, and it has an area of 192,000 km^{2} (74,000 sq mi). This makes it larger than the American state of Florida (170,000 km^{2} [66,000 sq mi]), and a little smaller than the entire island of Great Britain (209,000 km^{2} [81,000 sq mi]). It is also very tall, with ice thickness from bedrock to surface measuring between 800 metres (2,624 1/2 ft) and 1,200 metres (3,937 ft). Due to this immense size, enormous mass is shed when the repeated ice calving events occur at the glacier's marine terminus—the point where grounding line is in contact with water. The largest events, on the glacier's more vulnerable western side, are seismically detectable at ranges up to 1,600 km (990 mi).

The third Antarctic expedition of Richard E. Byrd in 1940 is believed to be first official sighting of the coastline of Thwaites. Detailed mapping of the glacier's surface took place between 1959 and 1966. In 1967, it was officially named by the Advisory Committee on Antarctic Names after Fredrik T. Thwaites (1883–1961), who had never personally visited the glacier, but was a renowned glacial geologist, geomorphologist and professor emeritus at the University of Wisconsin–Madison. McMurdo Station is used by researchers studying the glacier, such as the International Thwaites Glacier Collaboration (ITGC).

=== Thwaites Glacier Tongue and Thwaites Iceberg Tongue ===
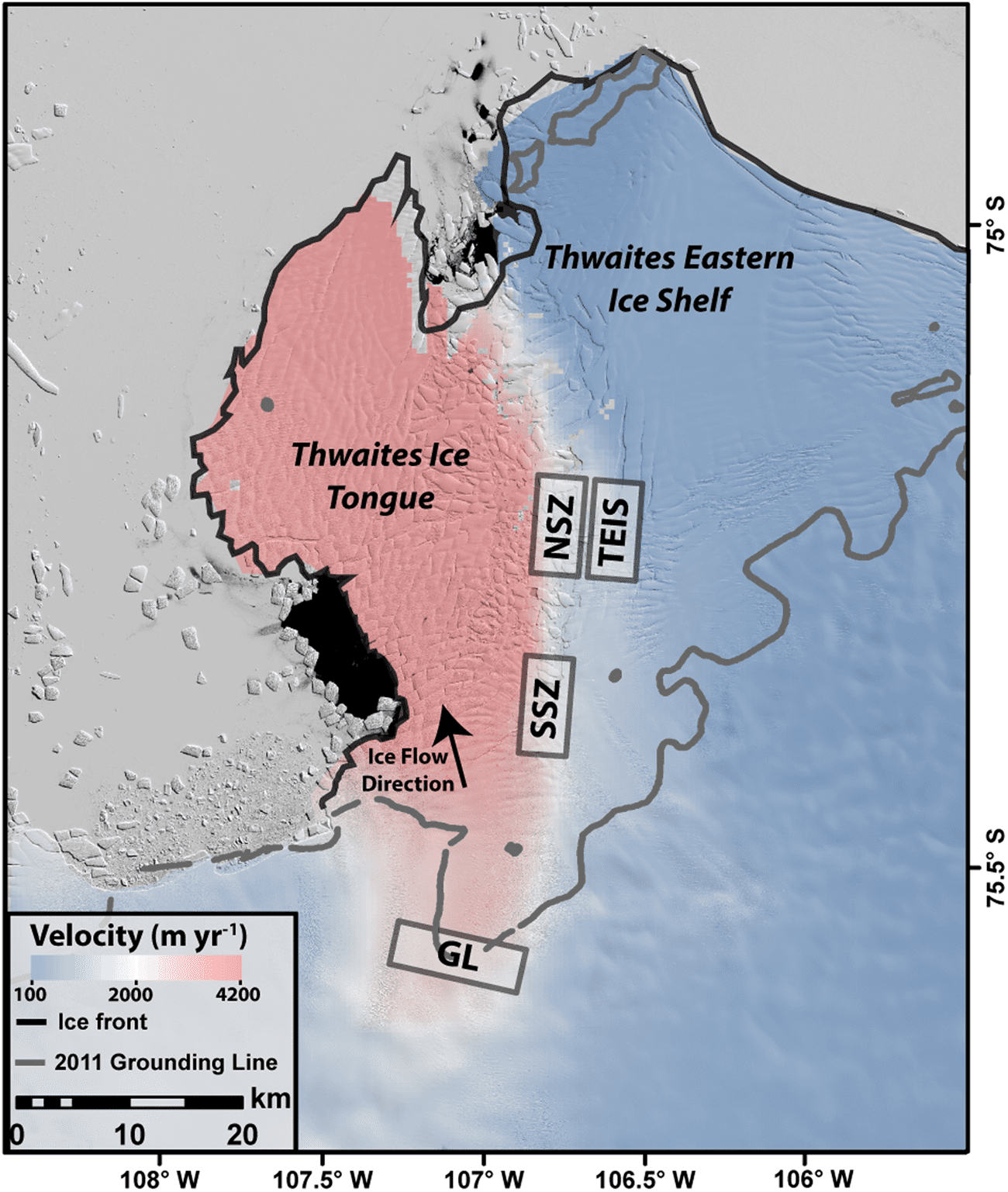
Thwaites Eastern Ice Shelf (TEIS) and Thwaites Ice Tongue in 2013, soon after the latter broke up and lost cohesion, leading to much faster retreat rates (red instead of blue). Other labels refer to the ice tongue's grounding line, and northern and southern shear zones where it is in direct contact with the ice shelf.

The Thwaites Glacier Tongue, or Western Glacier Tongue (75°0′S 106°50′W) was a narrow, floating part of the glacier, located about 30 mi (48 km) east of Mount Murphy. It was the first part of the glacier to be mapped, based on 65,000 aerial photographs collected during Operation Highjump in 1947. Back then, it was about 95 km (59 mi) long and 60 km (37 mi) wide. By the time updated mapping took place during Operation Deepfreeze in 1967, the glacier tongue had advanced up to 75 km (47 mi) further north, and had also experienced massive ice calving events which had produced Thwaites Iceberg Tongue (74°0′S 108°30′W), a loose collection of icebergs occupying an area as large as 150 kilometres (93 mi) long and 35–65 kilometres (22–40 mi) wide at the time. After breaking off from Thwaites Glacier Tongue, those icebergs ran aground in the Amundsen Sea, about 20 mi (32 km) northeast of Bear Peninsula. Initially, their southern extent was 3 mi (4.8 km) north of Thwaites Glacier Tongue, but as parts of the iceberg tongue continued to calve, it diminished in size (to 70 mi [110 km] long and 20 mi [32 km] wide). By 1986, the iceberg tongue had rotated to the side and started to drift away, travelling 140 km (87 mi) west between 1986 and 1992.

==== Post-2010 break-up and current state ====
Thwaites Glacier Tongue had also experienced destructive changes, eventually shortening to 40 mi (64 km) long and 20 mi (32 km) wide. By 2012, it went from an ice tongue firmly attached to the rest of the glacier to a series of icebergs floating next to each other, each no larger than 1–5 km (0.62–3.11 mi) in width and only held in place by sea ice. The final remainder of the old glacier tongue, with an area of 470 km^{2} (180 sq mi), disintegrated in 2016. This "melange" of icebergs is still referred to by its old name, as it continues to occupy a substantial amount of area and may retain a stabilizing effect on the glacier. However, future retreat of the surrounding sea ice is likely to trigger disintegration of ever-larger sections, like during the 2019 disintegration of icebergs on its western margin. In 2023, scientists found that ice tongue retreat rates are subject to wide fluctuations after its break-up: over six years of observations, annual retreat accelerated by as much as 40% (from around 4 km [2.5 mi] to 6 km [3.7 mi] per year) twice, before slowing back down. These researchers have also repurposed a machine learning algorithm normally used in microbiology to identify crevasses in the remains of the ice tongue and project how they may affect its stability.

==== Iceberg B-22a ====
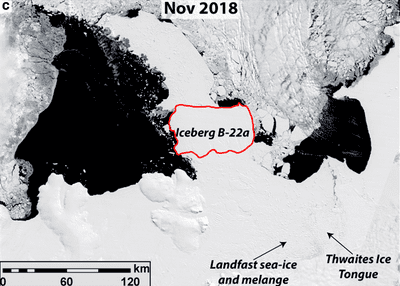
B-22A in 2018, next to the remains of the Western Glacier Tongue

On 15 March 2002, a notable calving event took place, when the National Ice Center reported that an iceberg named B-22 broke off. This iceberg was about 85 km (53 mi) long by 65 km (40 mi) wide, with a total area of some 5,490 km^{2} (2,120 sq mi), comparable to Rhode Island. While most of the iceberg broke up quickly, the largest piece, B-22A, with an area of around 3,000 km^{2} (1,200 sq mi) or "twice the size of Houston, Texas", drifted in the vicinity of the glacier even as the rest of the glacier tongue continued to break up. In 2012, it got stuck on seafloor, 53 km (33 mi) away from the ice tongue, where its presence had some stabilizing impact on the rest of the glacier. In October 2022, it started moving again, rapidly drifting to the northwest. It is likely to be one of the longest-lived icebergs in history.

=== Thwaites Ice Shelf ===
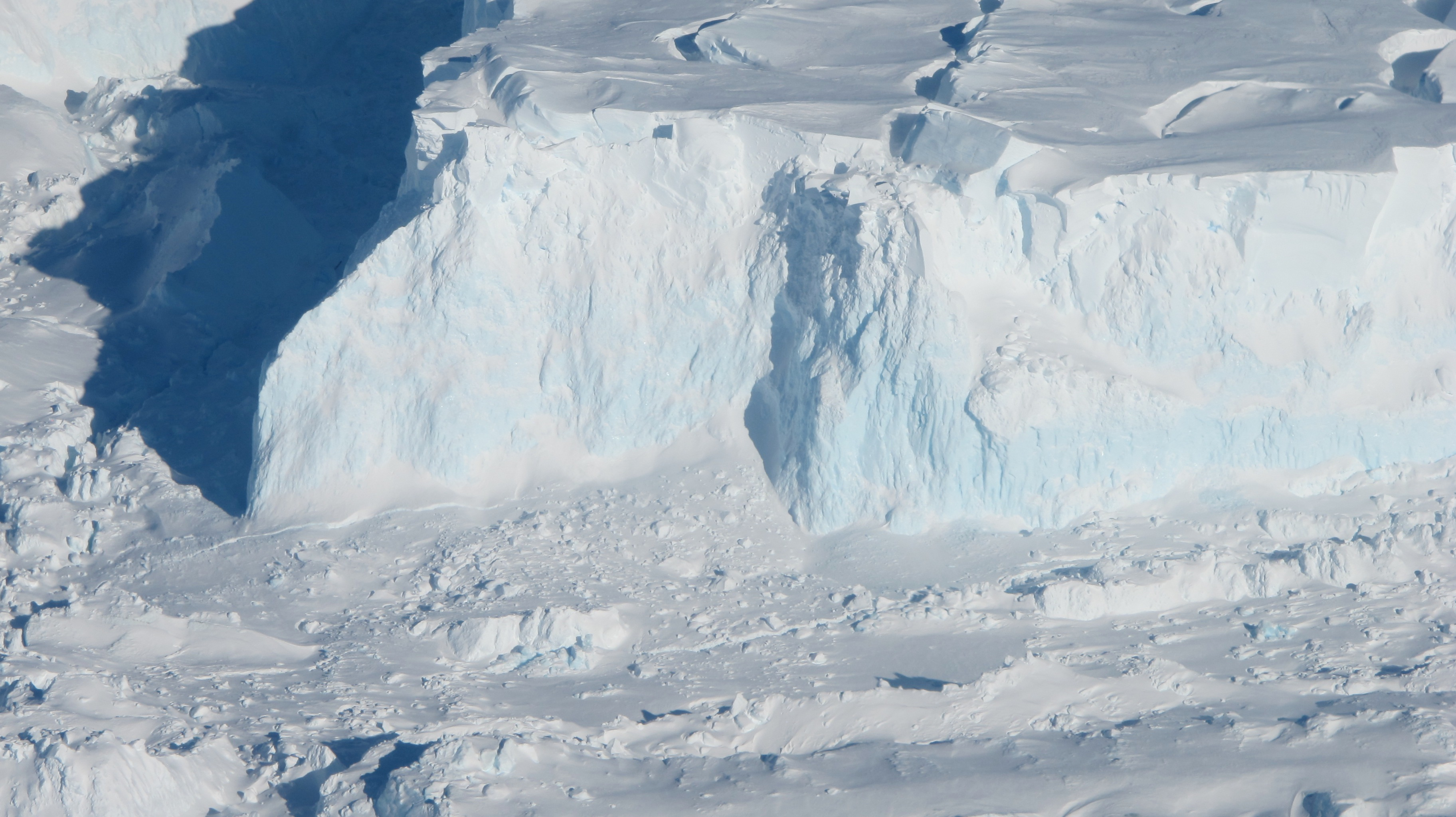
A close look at the shelf

Glaciers in Antarctica commonly have ice shelves, which are large bodies of sea ice that are permanently floating just offshore, and whose presence helps to stabilize the glacier. Though the Thwaites Ice Shelf has a width of 45 km (28 mi) and a vertical thickness of at least 587 m [1,926 ft]), it is relatively light for its size, and is stabilized by partially resting on an underwater mountain 50 km (31 mi) offshore. While it only shields the eastern part of the glacier (with the western formerly covered by the Ice Tongue), its presence is sufficient to counter large calving events on that side of the glacier. Under the hypothesis of marine ice cliff instability, ice cliffs at the edge of the glacier would be unsustainably tall once this ice shelf fails and no longer buttresses them, leading to a chain reaction of collapse over centuries. However, the accuracy of this hypothesis has been disputed in multiple papers, and some research suggests that the loss of the ice shelf would result in almost no change to the glacier's trajectory.

=== Subglacial features ===
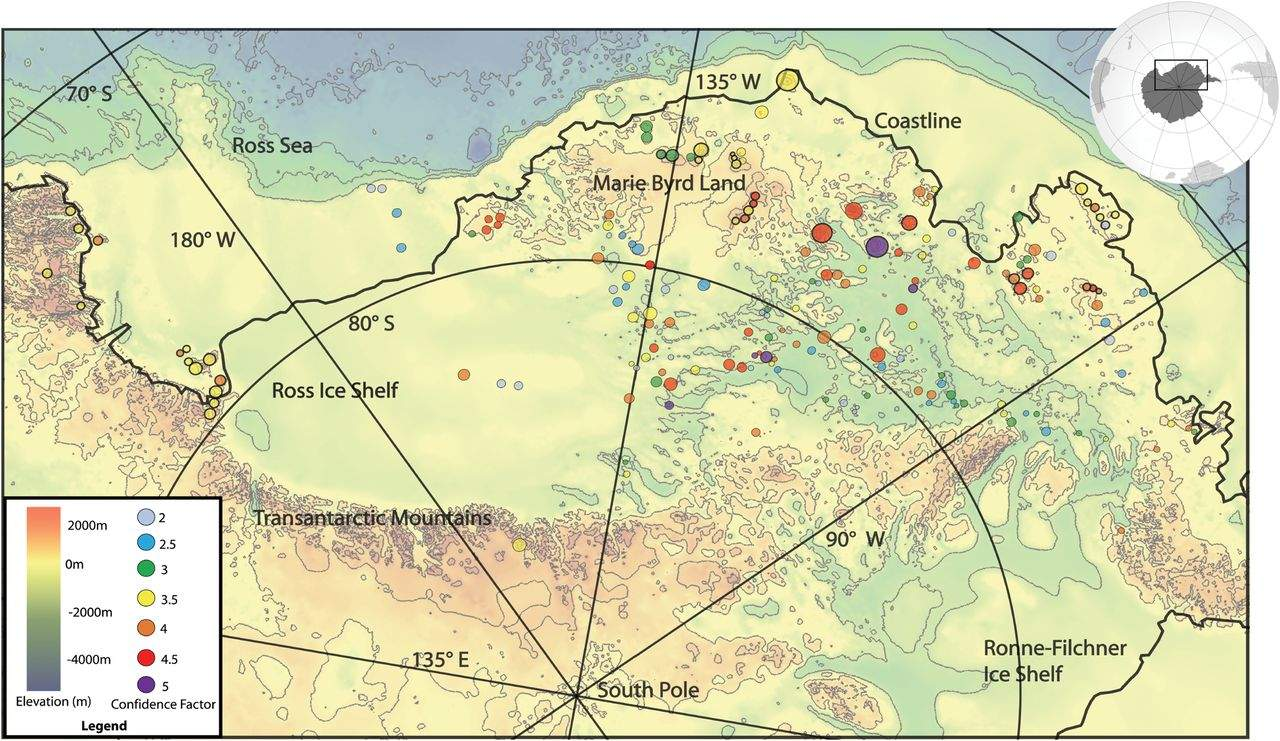
Map of various volcanoes found underneath the West Antarctic Ice Sheet

Swamp-like canal areas and streams underlie the glacier. The upstream swamp canals feed streams, while the dry areas between those streams slow the flow of the glacier. Due to this friction, the glacier is considered stable in the short term. As warming progresses, these streams expand and form larger structures underneath the glacier. The largest one to date was discovered by NASA researchers in 2019—an underwater cavity formed mostly in the previous three years, nearly 350 m (1,148 1/2 ft) tall and 4 km (2.5 mi) wide, with an area two-thirds the size of New York's Manhattan island.

In 2014, heat flow from geothermal activity in the area underneath Thwaites Glacier was found to be nearly twice the global average, and about 3.5 times larger in hotspots. By 2017, scientists had mapped 138 volcanoes beneath the West Antarctic Ice Sheet, with 91 of them previously unknown. Marie Byrd Land, the location of Thwaites and Pine Island Glaciers, was found to harbor around one volcano per every 11,200 km^{2} (4,300 sq mi) of area. This density is relatively high, though not as high as in other global hotspots such as the East African Rift (one per 7,200 km^{2} [2,800 sq mi]) or Antarctica's own central rift (one per 7,800 km^{2} [3,000 sq mi]). The heat from magma flows beneath these volcanoes can affect melting, and as more ice is lost, isostatic rebound increases the risk of volcano eruptions. At the same time, both Marie Byrd Land and the central rift also contain the majority of West Antarctica's 29 volcanoes whose height exceeds 1 km (0.62 mi), which remain covered by ice. This massive size is likely to make them into significant roadblocks to ice flows, and thus gives them the potential to delay glacier retreat in its advanced stages.

== Importance ==
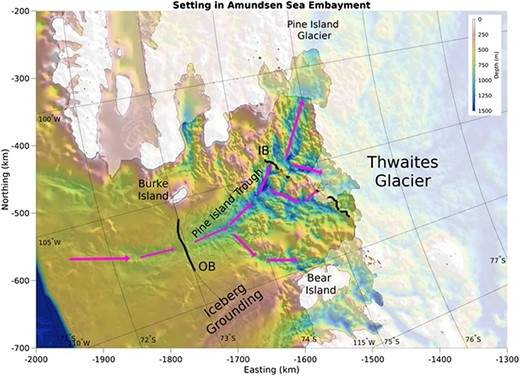
Arrows mark warm water currents, which are the main factor in the projected demise of the Thwaites Glacier.

Between 1992 and 2017, Thwaites Glacier retreated at between 0.3 km (0.19 mi) and 0.8 km (0.50 mi) annually, depending on the sector, and experienced a resulting net loss of over 600 billion tons of ice. This loss had caused about 4% of the global sea level rise over that period. If all of the ice contained within Thwaites Glacier melted (which is expected to take place over multiple centuries), that would raise the global sea level by 65 cm (25 1/2 in). This is more than twice as large as all of the sea level rise which occurred between 1901 and 2018 (estimated at 15–25 cm [6–10 in]), though only a fraction of the total sea level rise which would be seen in the future, particularly under high warming.

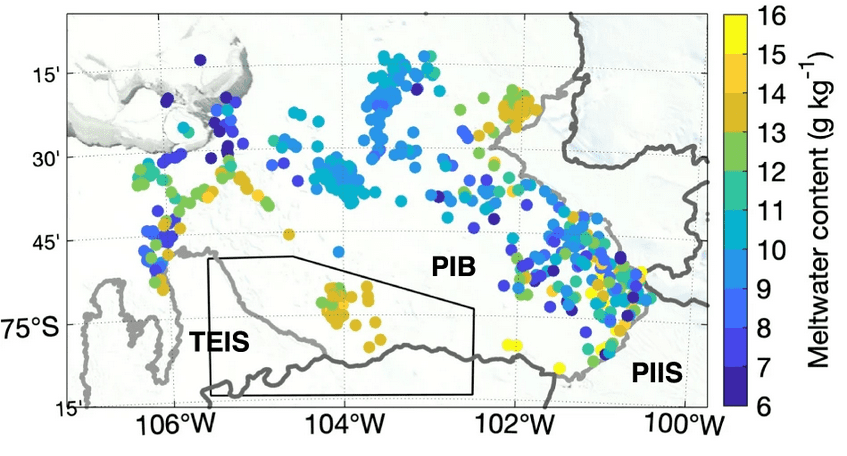
Distribution of meltwater hotspots caused by ice losses in Pine Island Bay, the location of both Thwaites (TEIS refers to Thwaites Eastern Ice Shelf) and Pine Island Glaciers

Fears of the entire West Antarctic Ice Sheet (WAIS) being prone to geologically rapid (centuries or even decades) collapse in response to accelerated warming from greenhouse gas emissions have been present since the seminal 1968 paper by glaciologist J. H. Mercer. These concerns were reiterated by Mercer's 1978 follow-up study and by another study in 1973. In 1981, scientists also advanced the theory that "the weak underbelly" of the WAIS lay in the Amundsen Sea region, with the collapse of Thwaites and Pine Island Glaciers serving as the trigger for the subsequent collapse of the entire ice sheet. This theory was informed by radar measurement data from research flights over West Antarctica in the 1960s and 1970s, which had revealed that in Pine Island Bay, the glacier bed slopes downwards at an angle, and lies well below the sea level. This topography, in addition to proximity to powerful ocean currents, makes both glaciers particularly vulnerable to increases in ocean heat content. Subsequent research reinforced the hypothesis that Thwaites is the single part of the cryosphere that would have the largest near-term impact on the sea levels, and that it is likely to disappear even in response to climate change which had already occurred. Similarly, there is now widespread agreement that its loss is likely to pave the way for the loss of the entire West Antarctic Ice Sheet, which would raise the sea levels by around 3.3 m (10 ft) over several centuries or millennia.

Once the potential contribution of Thwaites to future sea level rise became better known, some stories have started to refer to it as the Doomsday Glacier. The first known usage of that nickname was in a May 2017 Rolling Stone magazine article by Jeff Goodell, and it has subsequently been used more widely. While some scientists have embraced the name, many others, including leading researchers like Ted Scambos, Eric Rignot, Helen Fricker and Robert Larter have criticized it as alarmist and inaccurate.

== Observations and predictions ==
=== Early observations ===
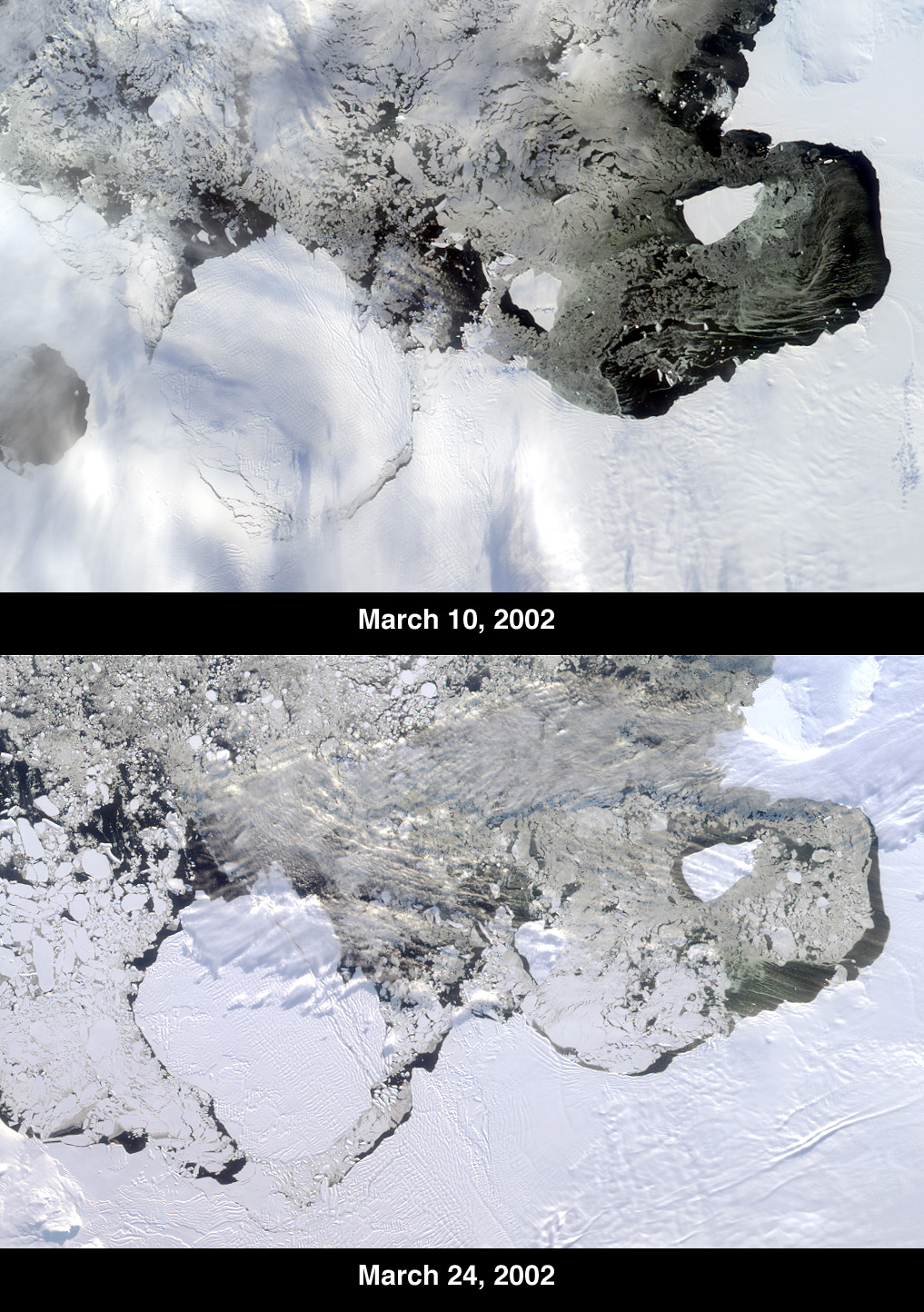
The B-22 iceberg broke off from the Thwaites Glacier Tongue on March 15, 2002.

In 2001, an analysis of radar interferometry data from the Earth Remote Sensing Satellites 1 and 2 by Eric Rignot revealed that the grounding line of Thwaites Glacier had retreated by 1.4 km (0.87 mi) between 1992 and 1996, while its strongly negative mass balance (annual loss of around 16 billion tonnes of ice, equivalent to 17 km^{3} of volume) meant that the retreat was going to continue. Further analysis of this data suggested that each 0.1 °C (0.18 °F) increase in ocean temperature would accelerate annual bottom-up melting by 1 m (3.3 ft). In 2002, a team of scientists from Chile and NASA on board a P-3 Orion from the Chilean Navy collected the first radar sounding and laser altimetry survey of the glacier, confirming the acceleration in thinning and retreat, and concluding that local seabed topography provides no obstacles to rapid retreat. These discoveries prompted an extensive airborne campaign in 2004–2005 by the University of Texas at Austin, followed by NASA's IceBridge Campaign in 2009–2018. Geophysical data collected from IceBridge campaign flights showed that the most vulnerable parts of Thwaites Glacier sit 1.5 mi (2.4 km) below the sea level.

In 2011, an analysis of IceBridge data showed a rock ridge 700 m (2,300 ft) tall, which helps to anchor the glacier and slows its glacier's slide into the sea. In early 2013, a minor increase of ice flow was detected, which was later attributed to the activity of subglacial lakes upstream of the grounding line. Altogether, annual ice loss had increased substantially since Rignot's 2001 analysis: from around 16 billion tonnes of ice between 1992 and 1996 to about 50 billion tons between 2002 and 2016. Cumulative ice loss over those 14 years was equivalent to a global sea level rise of 2.07 mm.

A 2014 paper noted that while the Thwaites Glacier was expected to add less than 0.25 mm of global sea level rise per year over the 21st century, this would eventually increase to over 1 mm per year during its expected "rapid collapse" phase. In 2018, a team of glaciologists, including Eric Rignot, had published projections of Thwaites Glacier contribution to sea level rise for the next 100 years. They estimated that the ice lost from Thwaites alone over the next 30 years would amount to 5 mm of sea level rise, but there was less certainty about 100-year ice loss, which could range between 14 and 42 mm depending on ice sheet dynamics. Further, their simulations could not represent the impact of the eastern ice shelf breaking up entirely.

=== International Thwaites Glacier Collaboration ===
In 2017, British and American research institutions founded a five-year research mission named International Thwaites Glacier Collaboration (ITGC). The mission involves over 100 scientists and support staff, with an estimated cost of $50 million across the entire research period.

In 2020, ITGC researchers discovered that at the glacier's baseline, the temperature of the water was over 2 °C (36 °F) above freezing point. Follow-up ITGC research published in 2023, which observed the underside of the glacier over nine months through a 587-metre-deep (1,926 ft) borehole and a robotic mini-submarine, found numerous unexpected cracks, or crevasses, where melting proceeded much faster. Crevassed areas amount to 10% of the glacier's underside, yet 27% of its current ice loss. Their research had also found that stratification between the fresh meltwater from the glacier and the salty ocean water caused the overall melting rate to proceed "far less rapidly than predicted by models".

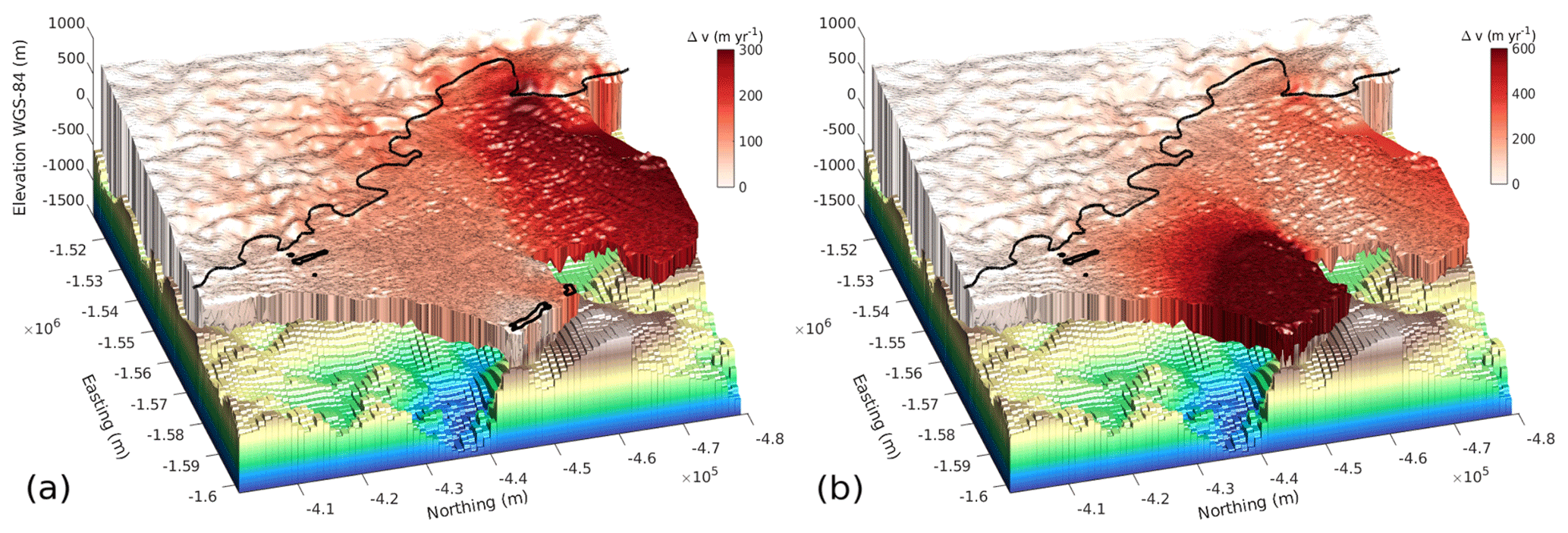
The comparison of current rates of retreat on the eastern side of Thwaites (left) and ones projected after the collapse of the Thwaites Ice Shelf. This projection was challenged the following year.

In 2021, ITGC research suggested that the Thwaites Ice Shelf, which restrains the eastern portion of the Thwaites Glacier, could start to collapse within five years. This would lead to a greater outflow from the glacier, increasing its annual contribution to sea level rise from 4% to 5% in the near term. In December 2021, ITGC glaciologist Erin Pettit noted in an interview that Thwaites, along with the rest of the West Antarctic Ice Sheet, would start to see major losses "within decades" after the ice shelf's failure, and this would be especially pronounced if the anthropogenic emission trajectory does not decrease by then. In her own words: "We'll start to see some of that before I leave this Earth." Additionally, ITGC glaciologist, Indrani Das, works with the ITGC sub-group, PROcesses, Drivers, and Predictions: modeling the history and Evolution of Thwaites (PROPHET) and uses remote sensing to evaluate ice sheet models She notes in an interview how the rate at which the Thwaites Glacier retreats "has huge consequences for the West Antarctic ice sheet stability and sea level rise."

=== Other recent research ===
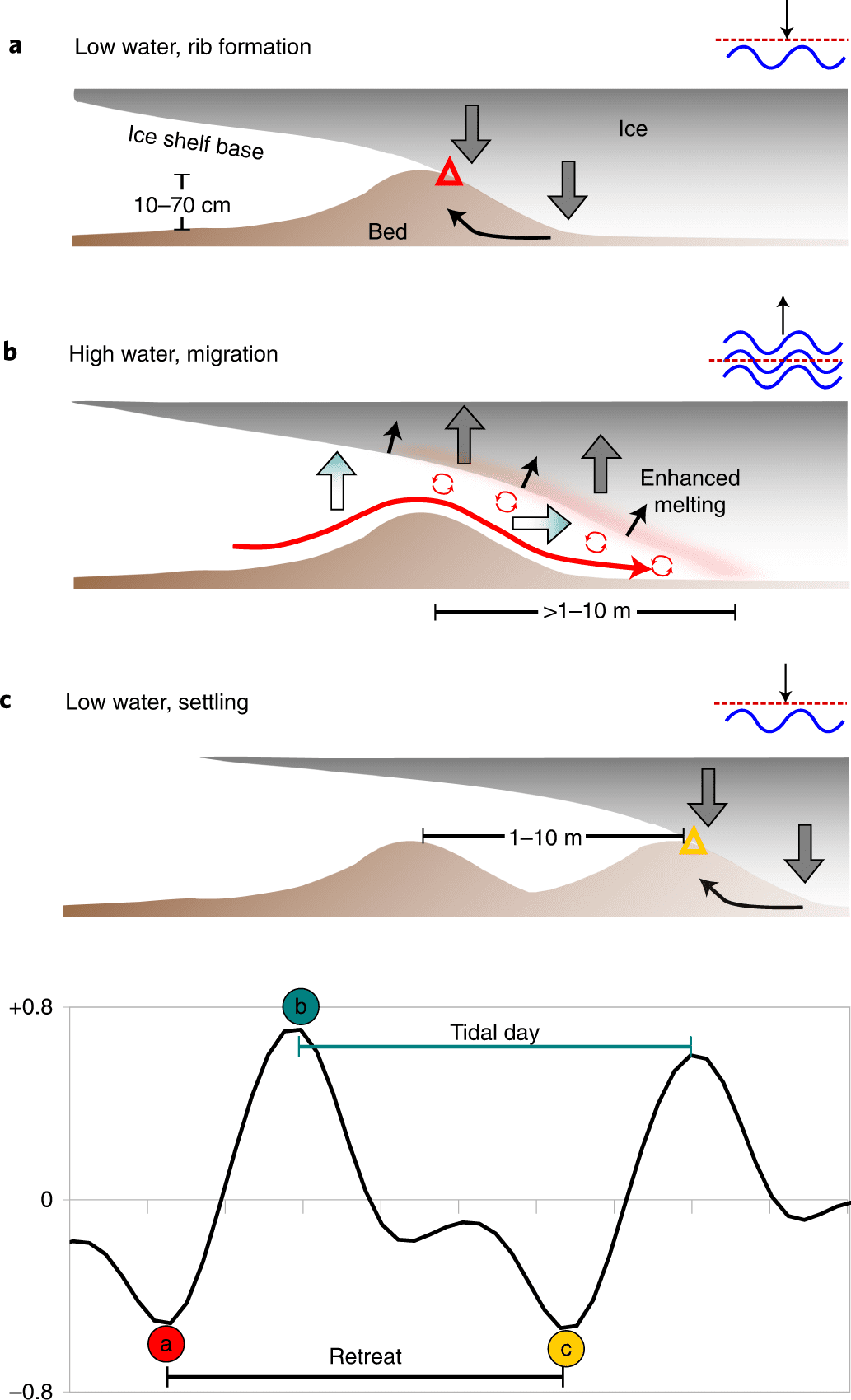
Diagram explaining how grounding line movement left behind "ribs" on the seafloor now used by the researchers to estimate the glacier's past rates of retreat

A 2022 study described the "rapid retreat" of the Thwaites Glacier, inferring its past movement in the pre-satellite era by analyzing "ribs" left behind after seabed gouging by ice. It found that at some point in the last two centuries, the glacier moved 2.1 km (1.3 mi) per year, twice the rate it did between 2011 and 2019. This rate of retreat could reoccur if the glacier recedes and is dislodged beyond a sea bed that is now keeping it somewhat stable. In 2023, researchers found that at the end of the Last Glacial Maximum, an ice sheet covering what is now Norway retreated at 50 to 600 metres per day over the course of several days to months, far faster than any rate observed today, because its bed, the ground it rested on, was flat. As Thwaites Glacier continues to retreat, the grounding line will eventually reach a similarly flat portion, and the researchers suggested that a part of the glacier could then disappear similarly quickly. This finding does not change the annual average melting rate for the rest of the glacier.

A model created in 2023 suggested that as the outer ice at Thwaites melts due to warm water currents, it erodes in a way which strengthens the flow of those currents. While this climate change feedback was not a surprise, the model estimated that over the past 12 years, this feedback accelerated melting by 30%, or as much as what is expected from a century of a high-emission climate change scenario in the absence of this feedback. If confirmed, this means that the melting of Thwaites Glacier can be expected to accelerate at a similar rate for the next century, regardless of whether ocean temperature keeps increasing, or stops. Other 2023 research suggests that over the 21st century, water temperatures in the entire Amundsen Sea are likely to increase at triple the historical rate even with low or "medium" atmospheric warming and even faster with high warming, which further "worsens the outlook" for the glacier.

In 2024, research indicated that instead of a relatively narrow grounding line which separates the parts of the glacier exposed to water and those safely behind them, there is a wider grounding zone of 2–6 km (1.2–3.7 mi) which is regularly exposed to water. Some areas of the glacier are additionally exposed to meltwater flowing another 6 km (3.7 mi) inwards during the strong spring tides. This increased exposure to meltwater would increase the rate of ice loss, potentially doubling the rate of the previous projections.

=== Predicted timelines for glacier collapse ===
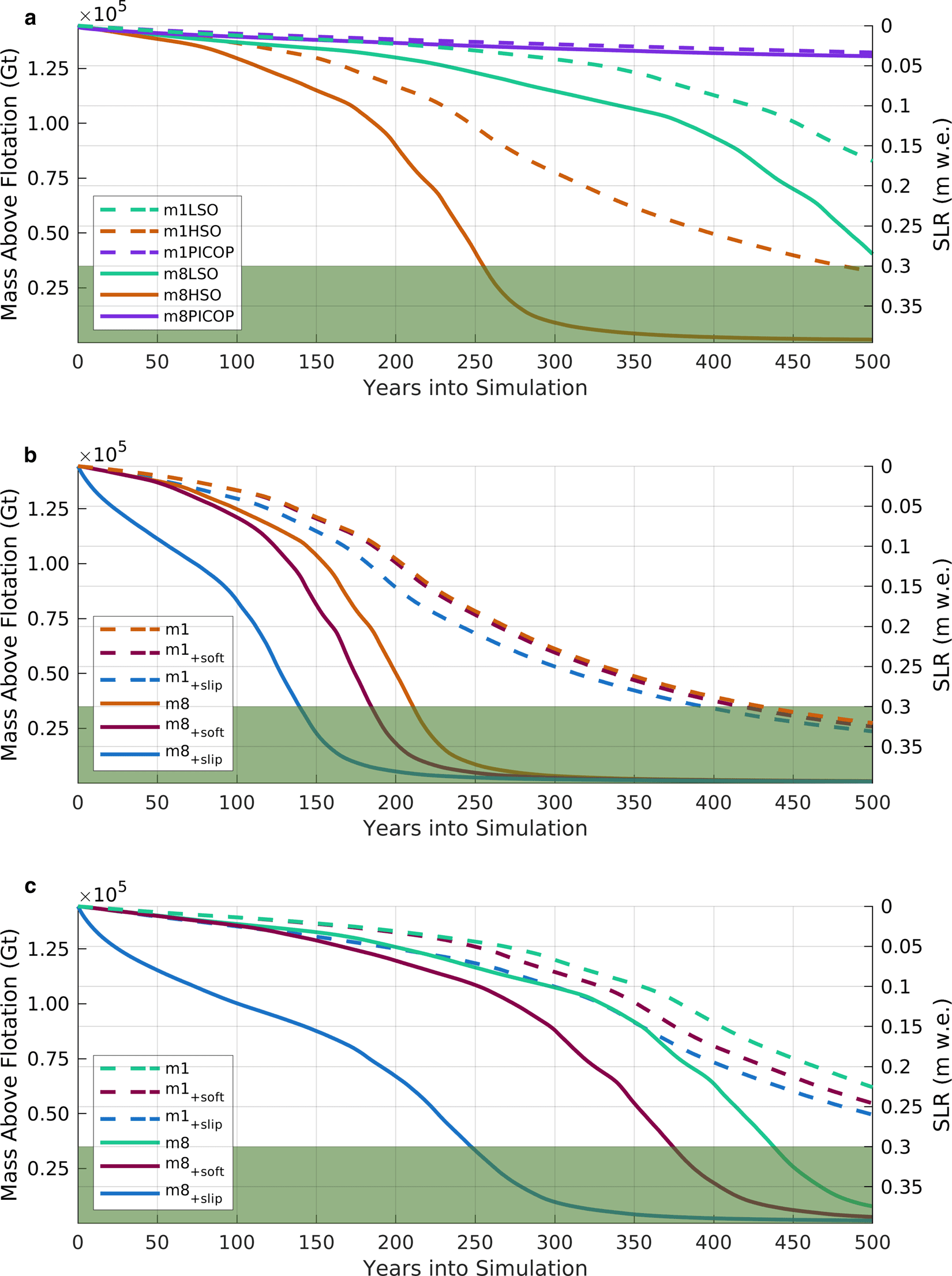
Contribution to sea level rise from a modelled area of Thwaites Glacier under high and low warming (HSO and LSO) and high (m1) and low (m8) friction. Top shows both warming scenarios in a high-detail model, while middle and bottom graphics show the HSO and LSO scenarios in low-resolution models.

A 2014 study, using satellite measurements and computer models, predicted that only the lowest possible warming offered any chance of preserving Thwaites Glacier: otherwise, it will inevitably reach the point of "rapid and irreversible collapse" in the next 200 to 900 years. Once that happens, its retreat would add over 1 mm to the global annual sea level rise until it disappears.

A 2022 assessment of tipping points in the climate system did not consider Thwaites Glacier on its own, but it did note that the entire West Antarctic Ice Sheet would most likely take 2,000 years to disintegrate entirely once it crosses its tipping point, and the minimum plausible timescale is 500 years, and could be as long as 13,000 years. It also noted that this tipping point for the entire ice sheet is no more than 3 °C (5.4 °F) of global warming away, and is very likely to be triggered around the near-future levels of 1.5 °C (2.7 °F): at worst, it may have been triggered by now, after the warming passed 1 °C (1.8 °F) in the early 21st century.

In May 2023, a modelling study considered the future of Thwaites Glacier over the course of 500 years. Due to computational limitations, it was able to simulate about two-thirds of the glacier catchment (volume of ice equivalent to 40 cm (15 1/2 in) of the global sea level rise, rather than the 65 cm (25 1/2 in) contained in the full glacier). It found that the uncertainty about glacier bed friction was almost as important as the future ocean temperature. Another finding was that lower-resolution models (those which simulated the glacier as a mesh of 20 km^{2} (7.7 sq mi) areas) consistently estimated faster break-up than the more detailed models with mesh size of 6.5 km^{2} (2.5 sq mi). While in the less-detailed models, practically the entirety of the simulated area was lost around a 250-year mark under the combination of high warming and low friction, higher-resolution simulation showed that about a quarter would remain under those conditions, to be lost over 100 more years. Under high warming yet high seabed friction, a quarter was left at the end of 500 years in the detailed simulations. The same outcome occurred under low warming and low friction. With low warming and high friction, over half of the studied area remained after 500 years.

== Engineering options for stabilization ==
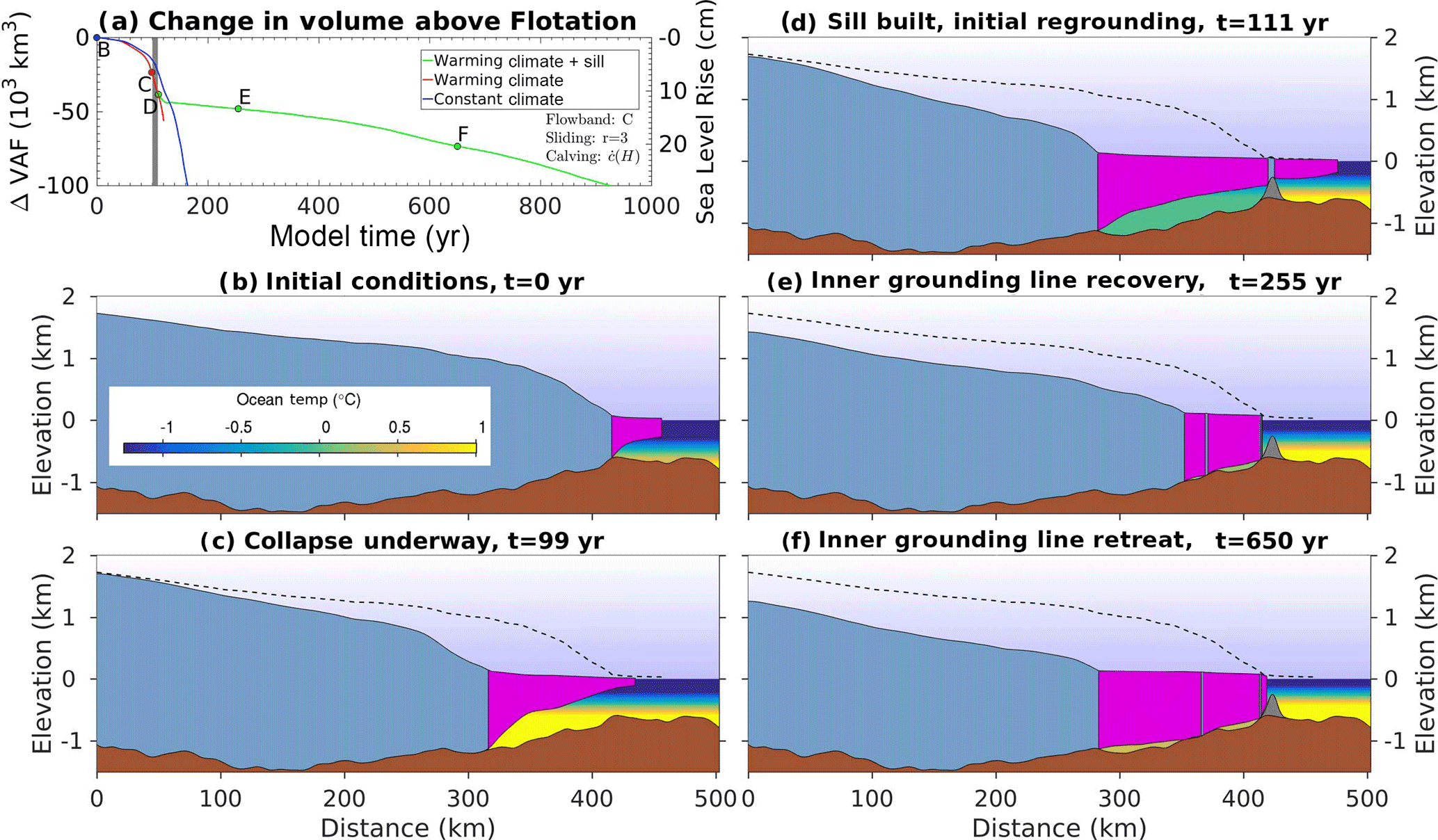
A proposed "underwater sill" blocking 50% of warm water flows heading for the glacier could have the potential to delay its collapse and the resultant sea level rise by many centuries.

Some engineering interventions have been proposed for Thwaites Glacier and the nearby Pine Island Glacier to physically stabilize its ice or to preserve it. These interventions would block the flow of warm ocean water, which currently renders the collapse of these two glaciers practically inevitable even without further warming. A proposal from 2018 included building sills at the Thwaites' grounding line to either physically reinforce it, or to block some fraction of warm water flow. The former would be the simplest intervention, yet equivalent to "the largest civil engineering projects that humanity has ever attempted". It is also only 30% likely to work. Constructions blocking even 50% of the warm water flow are expected to be far more effective, yet far more difficult as well. Some researchers argued that this proposal could be ineffective, or even accelerate sea level rise. The authors of the original proposal suggested attempting this intervention on smaller sites, like the Jakobshavn Glacier in Greenland, as a test. They also acknowledged that this intervention cannot prevent sea level rise from the increased ocean heat content, and would be ineffective in the long run without greenhouse gas emission reductions.

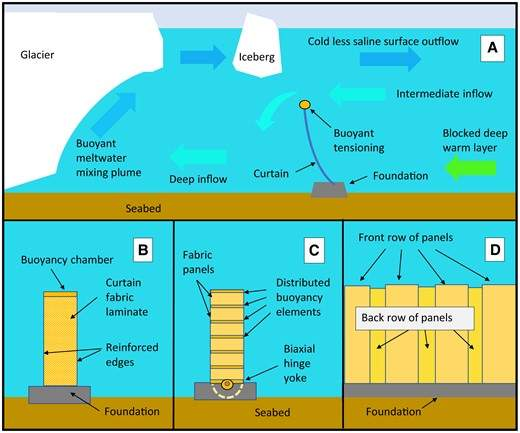
Diagram of a proposed "curtain"

In 2023, it was proposed that an installation of underwater curtains, made of a flexible material and anchored to the Amundsen Sea floor would be able to interrupt warm water flow. This approach would reduce costs and increase the longevity of the material (conservatively estimated at 25 years for curtain elements and up to 100 years for the foundations) relative to more rigid structures. With them in place, Thwaites Ice Shelf and Pine Island Ice Shelf would possibly regrow to a state they last had a century ago, thus stabilizing these glaciers. To achieve this, the curtains would have to be placed at a depth of around 600 m (0.37 mi) (to avoid damage from icebergs which would be regularly drifting above) and be 80 km (50 mi) long. The authors acknowledged that while work on this scale would be unprecedented and face many challenges in the Antarctic (including polar night and the currently insufficient numbers of specialized polar ships and underwater vessels), it would also not require new technology and there is experience of laying pipelines at such depths.

The authors estimated this project would take a decade to construct, at $40–80 billion initial cost, while the ongoing maintenance would cost $1–2 billion a year. Yet, a single seawall capable of protecting the entire New York City may cost twice as much on its own, and the global costs of adaptation to sea level rise caused by the glaciers' collapse are estimated to reach $40 billion annually: The authors also suggested that their proposal would be competitive with the other climate engineering proposals like stratospheric aerosol injection (SAI) or carbon dioxide removal (CDR), as while those would stop a much larger spectrum of climate change impacts, their estimated annual costs range from $7–70 billion for SAI to $160–4,500 billion for CDR powerful enough to help meet the 1.5 °C (2.7 °F) Paris Agreement target.

== See also ==
- Retreat of glaciers since 1850
- Sif Island
- List of volcanoes in Antarctica
- List of seamounts in the Southern Ocean
