= Iceberg B-46 =

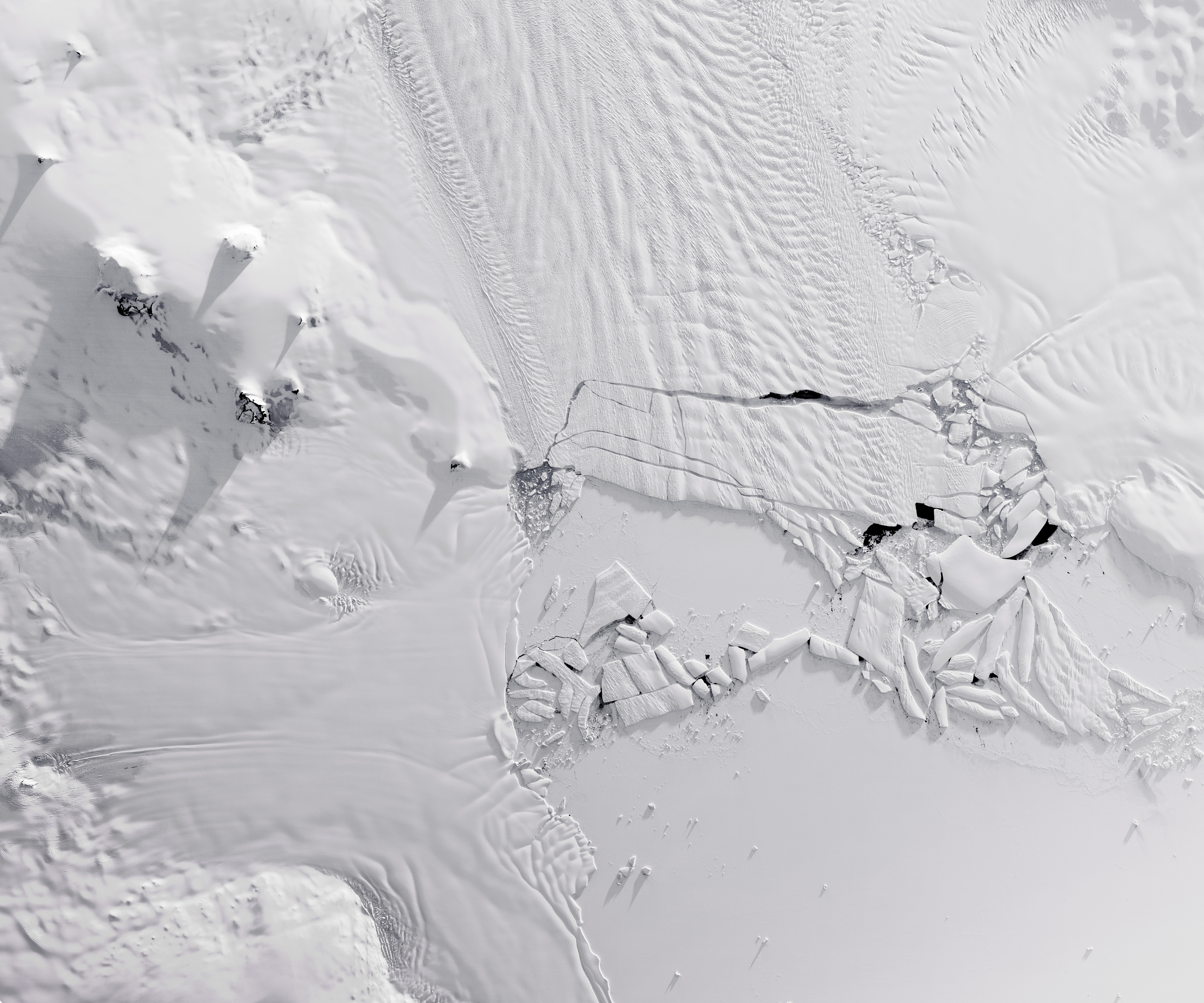
Iceberg B-46 calving from the Pine Island Glacier

Iceberg B-46 is a large iceberg that broke free from Pine Island Glacier in Antarctica in October 2018. It was 225 km^{2} at its greatest extent. The iceberg was detected by the Landsat 8 satellite and later photographed by a NASA DC-8 as part of their IceBridge recording project.

The shedding of icebergs by the Pine Island Glacier used to occur on average every 6 years; but has become a near annual event.
