= Indrani Das =

Indian-American glaciologist and geophysicist

- Education: Guwati University (B.S. and M.S.) Indian Space Research Organization (Ph.D.)
- Occupations: Glaciology, geophysics
- Employer(s): Lamont-Doherty Earth Observatory, Columbia University

Indrani Das is an Indian-American glaciologist and cryospheric geophysicist known for her research and work in Alaska, Antarctica, and Greenland. She is primarily known for her expertise with the Thwaites Glacier, satellite and airborne remote sensing, and her contributions to Antarctic ice sheets and glaciers' role and impact to ice-ocean interactions. Her research has improved how scientists measure and predict ice loss, and have reshaped climate models used to predict global sea-level rise.

== Early life and education ==
Indrani Das was born in West Bengal, India on January 10, 1975. She obtained a Bachelor of Science in physics with honors from Cotton College, Guwahati University in 1997, and a Master of Science in physics, with a specialization in particle physics, from Guwahati University in 1999. Das later received her Ph.D. in atmospheric sciences through the Indian Space Research Organization in 2007. While here, she worked on "radiative transfer algorithms to retrieve marine aerosols from satellite data".

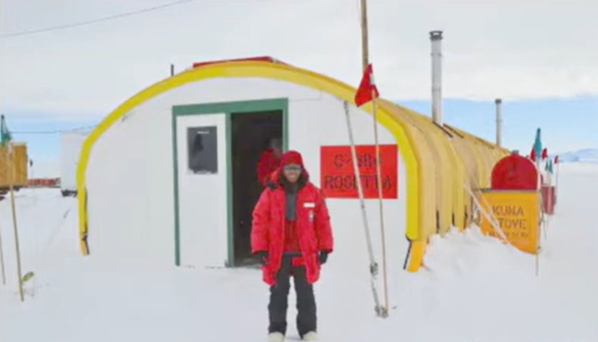
Das outside of a research tent at McMurdo Station

== Career and impact ==
Das began publishing her research in 2001, using IRS P4-Ocean Color Monitors and ground-based sun photometer measurements to study how satellite data can be used to find marine aerosols floating on the ocean's surface.

After spending time in the Himalayas studying snow depths in 2007, Das did her first post-doctorate program with the Glaciology Group at the University of Alaska Fairbanks. While there, she used airborne laser altimetry and satellite imagery to measure how much ice from the Alaskan Wrangell Mountain glaciers had lost over time, and how their mass balance has contributed to sea-level rise. She began her second post-doc at the Lamont-Doherty Earth Observatory (LDEO) at Columbia University (2010), where she studied mass balances in Alaska, Greenland, and Antarctica. Das is currently an Associate Research Professor at the Columbia Climate School Lamont-Doherty Earth Observatory, where she studies the effects of mass balance of ice sheets and ice shelves using satellite altimetry, remote sensing, and ground-based fieldwork.

Later in 2013, she led research on how katabatic winds in East Antarctica are contributing to intense wind-scour zones and leading to 80 billion tons of snow loss to the atmosphere per year. She determined this by noticing irregularities in the radar data, which she used to develop a model to locate these scour zones. She contributed to the NASA IceBridge program (2011) and the ROSETTA-Ice program (2015) by performing Antarctica ground- and airborne field work. She later studied how much the ocean is melting the Ross Ice Shelf (2020) by mapping how melt rates have adjusted over time and by using decades-worth of airborne radar data.

As part of the International Thwaites Glacier Collaboration (ITGC) with the National Snow and Ice Data Center (NSIDC), Das was the co-PI for the PROcesses, Drivers, and Predictions: modeling the History and Evolution of Thwaites (PROPHET) program studying West Antarctica's biggest retreating glacier, the Thwaites Glacier. This Collaboration, is one of the biggest jointly, nationally funded Antarctic project between the United Kingdom and the United States since the 1940s. Das specifically researched how basal reflectivity from radar data can be used to accurately model, measure, and forecast how the rate of the Thwaites Glacier's ice loss will affect sea-level rise and coastlines. This modeling project used "a dense grid of ice-penetrating radar data collected by NASA to analyze how slippery the [glacial] bed is".

In recent years, concurrent with Thwaites Glacier research, she has given back to the science and education community through her involvement in LDEO speaker series that educate K-12 students and adults about her research, climate change, and general interest in Antarctica.

== Awards and achievements ==
- NASA Group Achievement award to NASA IceBridge field team (2011)
- Ph.D. Research Fellowship, Indian Space Research Organization (1999–2005)

== Selected works ==
- Das, I., Padman, L., Bell R. E., Fricker H., Tinto, K., Hulbe, C., Siddoway, C., Dhakal, T., Frearson, N., Mosebeux, C. (2020). Multidecadal basal melt rates and structure of the Ross Ice Shelf, Antarctica, using airborne ice penetrating radar. Journal of Geophysical Research: Earth Surface.
- Kinslake, J., Ely, J. C., Das, I., Bell R. E. (2017). Widespread movement of meltwater onto and across Antarctic ice shelves. Nature.
- Das, I., Bell R. E., Wolovick, M., Creyts, T., Studinger, M., Frearson, N., Nicolas, J., Lenaerts, J., van den Broeke, M. R. (2013). Influence of Persistent wind scour on the surface mass balance of Antarctica. Nature Geoscience.
- Das, I., Mohan, M., & Krishnamoorthy, K. (2002). Detection of marine aerosols with IRS P4-Ocean Colour Monitor. Journal of Earth System Science, 111(4), 425–435.
