= Pine Island Glacier =

Large ice stream, fastest melting glacier in Antarctica

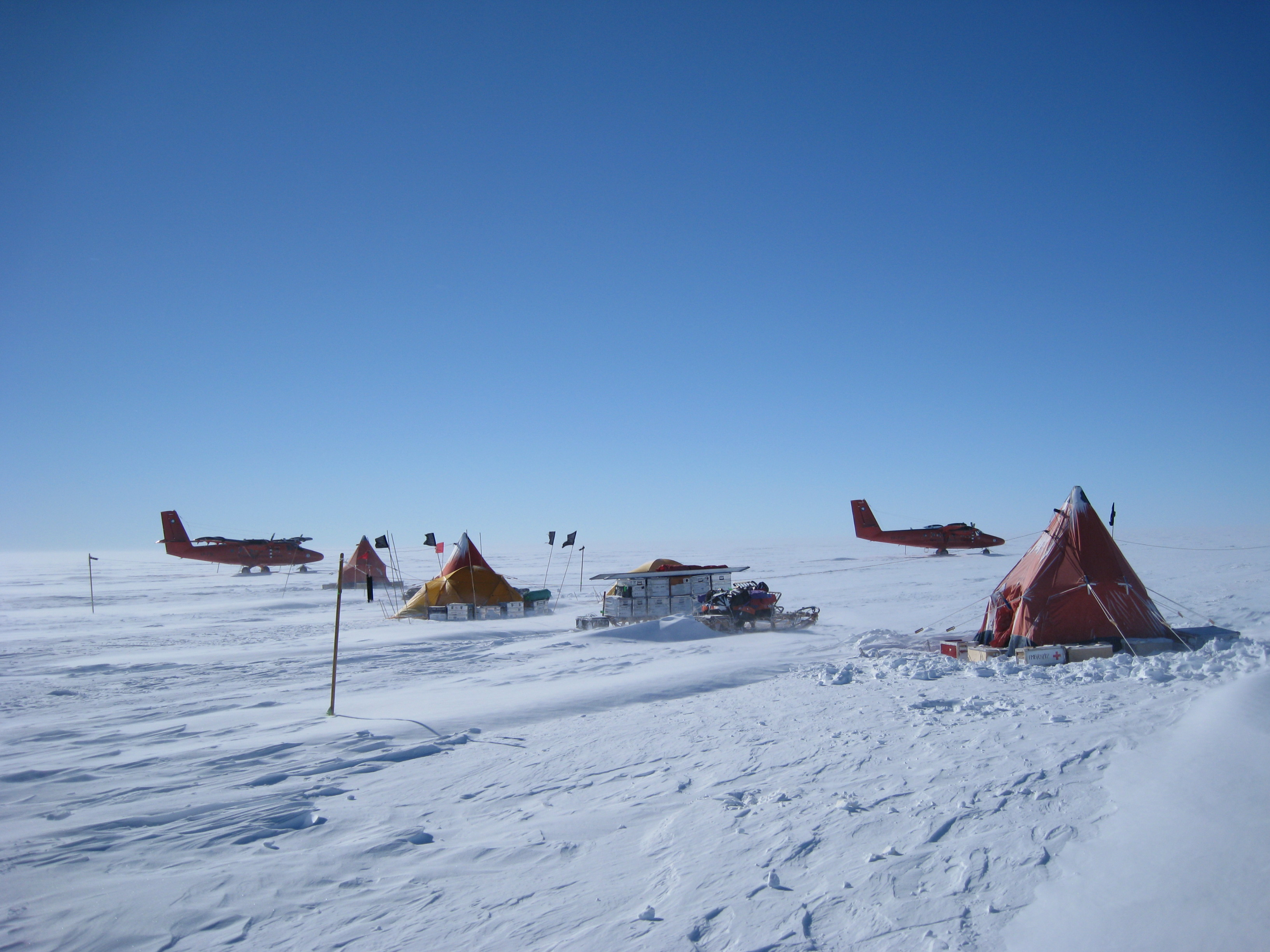
- British Antarctic Survey field camp on PIG

- Location within Antarctica
- Type: Ice stream
- Location: West Antarctic Ice Sheet, Antarctica
- Coordinates: 75°10′S 100°0′W
- Area: 175,000 km^{2} (68,000 sq mi) (whole catchment)
- Length: Approx. 250 km (160 mi)
- Thickness: Approx. 2 km (1.2 mi)
- Terminus: Floating Ice shelf
- Status: Accelerating

Pine Island Glacier (PIG) is a large ice stream, and the fastest melting glacier in Antarctica. responsible for about 13% of Antarctica's ice loss. The glacier flows west-northwest along the south side of the Hudson Mountains into Pine Island Bay, part of the Amundsen Sea. The area drained by Pine Island Glacier comprises about 10% of the West Antarctic Ice Sheet. Satellite measurements have shown that the Pine Island Glacier Basin has a greater net contribution of ice to the sea than any other ice drainage basin in the world and this has increased due to recent acceleration of the ice stream. In recent years, the flow of the glacier has accelerated and the grounding line has retreated.

Since 2015, the calving of very large icebergs from the Pine Island Glacier has become a roughly annual event. The largest such iceberg, Iceberg B-46, had an initial size of 226 square kilometres (87 sq mi).

The glacier is extremely remote, but scientists have surveyed the ice with radar, GPS, and seismic sensors. Most of the data about the glacier has been gathered from aerial and satellite surveys.

Like the neighboring Thwaites Glacier, the Pine Island Glacier is a target of proposed engineering interventions to reduce ice loss.

== Location and setting ==
Map of Pine Island Glacier

The Pine Island Glacier is part of the Antarctic ice sheet, which is the largest mass of ice on earth, containing a volume of water equivalent to 57 m (187 ft) of global sea level. The ice sheet forms from snow which falls onto the continent and compacts under its own weight. The ice then moves under its own weight toward the edges of the continent. Most of the ice transport to the sea is by ice streams and outlet glaciers. The Antarctic ice sheet consists of the large, relatively stable, East Antarctic Ice Sheet and a smaller, less stable, West Antarctic Ice Sheet.

The West Antarctic Ice Sheet is drained into the sea by several large ice streams, most of which flow into either Ross Ice Shelf, or Filchner-Ronne Ice Shelf. Pine Island and Thwaites Glaciers are two major West Antarctic ice streams which do not flow into a large ice shelf. They are part of an area called the Amundsen Sea Embayment. A total area of 175,000 km^{2} (68,000 sq mi), 10 percent of the West Antarctic Ice Sheet, drains out to the sea via Pine Island Glacier, this area is known as the Pine Island Glacier drainage basin.

The Pine Island Glacier lies in a southeast extension of Pine Island Bay, part of the Amundsen Sea along the Walgreen Coast. To the northeast of the bay and glacier lies the Hudson Mountains, a volcanic field that consists of both subareal and subglacial volcanoes.

The glacier was mapped by the United States Geological Survey (USGS) from surveys and United States Navy (USN) air photos, 1960–66, and named by the Advisory Committee on Antarctic Names (US-ACAN) in association with Pine Island Bay.

== Importance ==
The Pine Island Glacier and Thwaites Glacier are two of Antarctica's five largest ice streams. Scientists have found that the flow of these ice streams has accelerated in recent years, and suggested that if they were to melt, global sea levels would rise by approximately 1.5 metres (59 in). This would destabilize the entire West Antarctic Ice Sheet and perhaps sections of the East Antarctic Ice Sheet. Pine Island Glacier is vulnerable to increased ice loss because its base lies below sea level and slopes downward inland. This suggests that there is no geological barrier to stop a retreat of the ice once it has started. Simulations show that once glacial retreat has begun, it may continue for centuries.

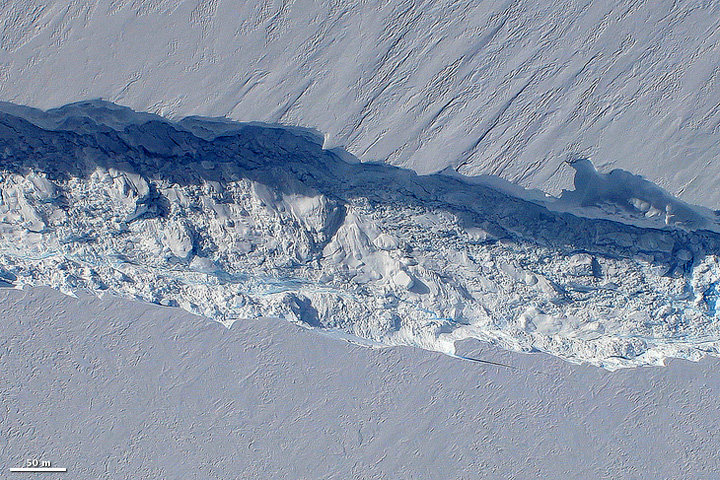
Birth of an iceberg.

Pine Island Glacier has lost approximately 1066 net gigatonnes of ice between 1979 and 2017, with ice discharge rates increasing from 80 gigatonnes per year between 1979-1989 to 133 gigatonnes per year in 2009-2017. The net loss implies much more water is being put into the sea than is supplied by snowfall. The net loss of ice from this glacier alone is 13% of the loss from the entire continent of Antarctica and caused global sea level to rise 0.34mm from the 1970s through the 1990s. Detailed simulations suggest that the Pine Island Glacier will contribute approximately 3 centimetres (1.2 in) of sea level rise over the next century.

In the 1940s, when the glacier started its retreat, the grounding line of the glacier was on an undersea ridge approximately 47 kilometres (29 mi) downstream of its grounding line in 2023. Of this retreat, 31 kilometres (19 mi) occurred between 1992 and 2011.

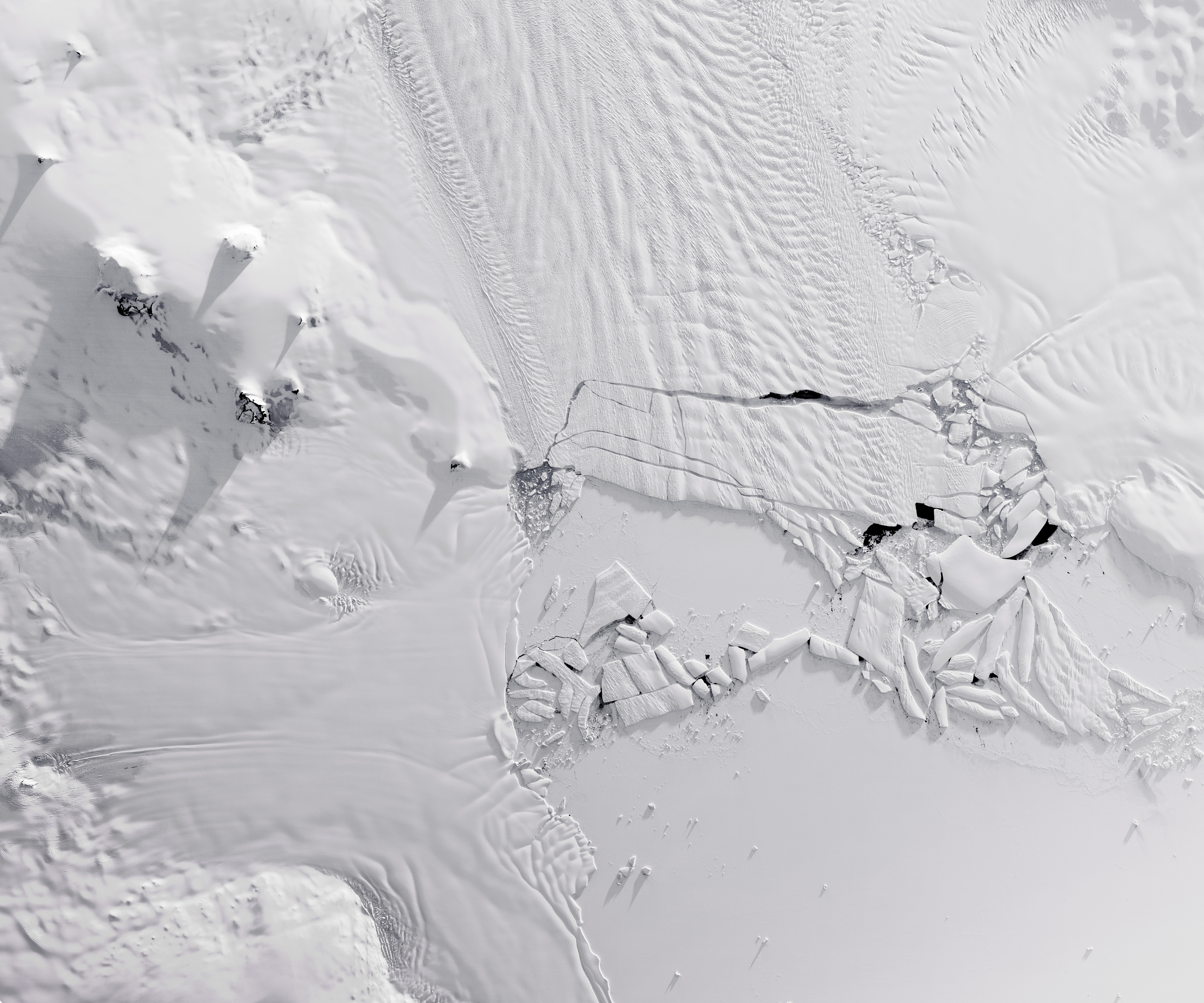
Pine Island Glacier calving Iceberg B-46 (226 km^{2} or 87 sq mi).

As the Pine Island Glacier retreats, it is speeding up and, since 2015, calving an unusual number of icebergs as large as 226 square kilometres (87 sq mi). The speed of Pine Island Glacier increased by 77 percent from 1974 to the end of 2013, with half of this increase occurring between 2003 and 2009. In 2020, Pine Island Glacier's ice velocity was over 10 metres (33 ft) per day. Measurements along the centre of the ice stream by GPS demonstrated that this acceleration is still high nearly 200 km (120 mi) inland: speeds in 2007 were 26-42% faster than in 1996.

As the ice stream accelerates it is also getting thinner. The rate of thinning within the central trunk has quadrupled from 1995 to 2006. At current speeds, the main trunk of the glacier could be afloat within 100 years.

== Observations ==
=== On the ice ===
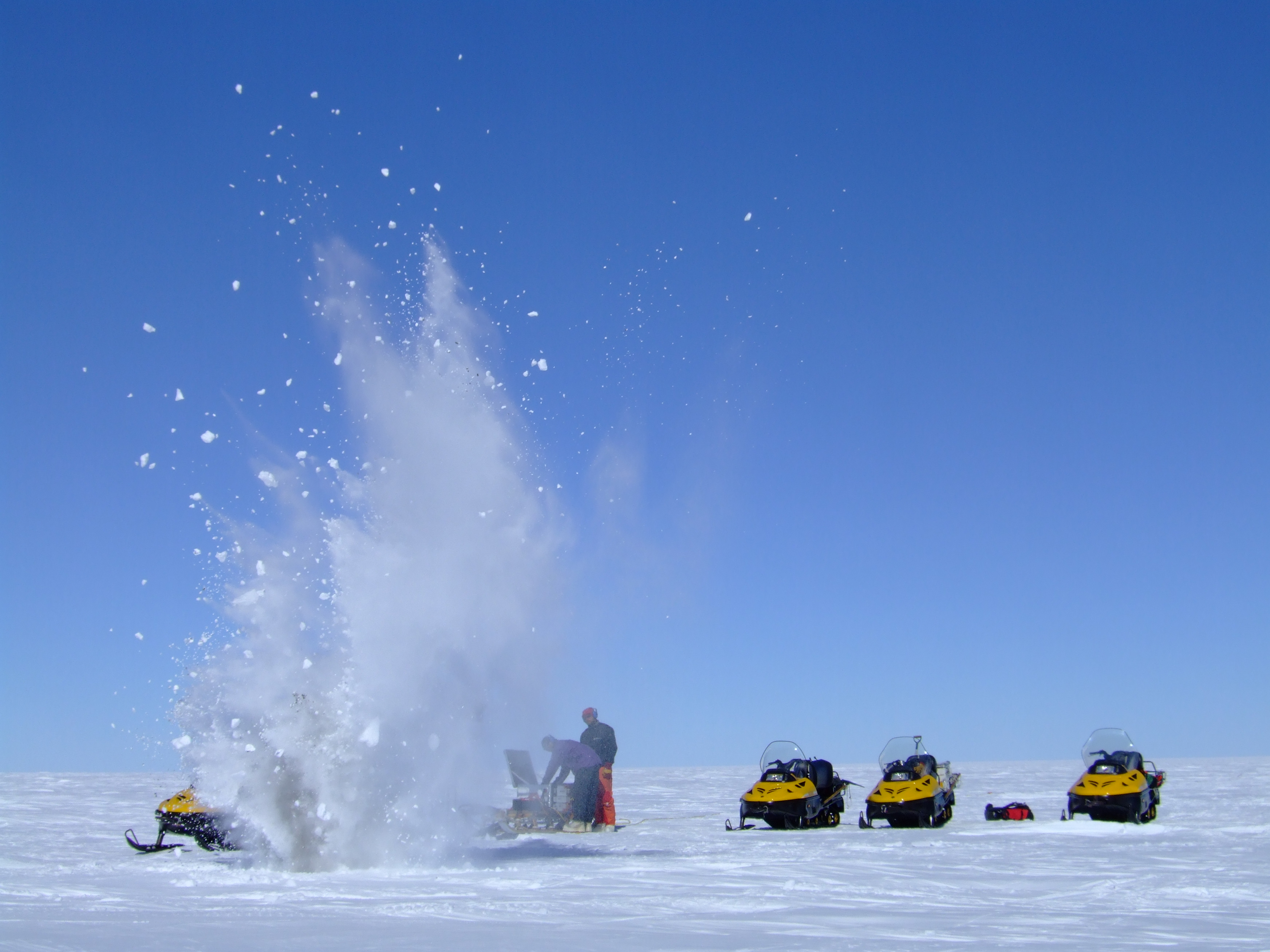
Seismic surveying on Pine Island Glacier

This animation shows a drill site location on the Pine Island Ice Shelf along with velocity-colored ocean flows.

The first expedition to visit the ice stream was a United States over-snow traverse, which spent around a week in the area of PIG during January 1961. They dug snow pits to measure snow accumulation and carried out seismic surveys to measure ice thickness. One of the scientists on this traverse was Charles R. Bentley, who said "we didn't know we were crossing a glacier at the time." PIG is around 50 km (31 mi) wide at the point visited and at ground level cannot be visually distinguished from the surrounding ice. This expedition was called the "Ellsworth Highland Traverse".

A team from the British Antarctic Survey arrived at the ice stream on 8 December 2006 for the first of two field seasons. In the second field season, they spent three months there from November 2007 to February 2008. Work on the glacier included radar measurements and seismic surveys.

In January 2008, a team led by Bob Bindschadler of NASA landed on the floating ice shelf of PIG for a reconnaissance mission to investigate the feasibility of drilling through around 500 m (1,600 ft) of ice, to lower instruments into the ocean cavity below. It was decided that the small crevasse free area was too hard for further landings and so further fieldwork had to be postponed. Therefore, two Global Positioning System (GPS) units and a weather station were positioned as near as possible to PIG.

In the 2011–2012 field season, the camp staff was finally able to establish the Main Camp just before New Year.The following week, Bindschadler and his team were able to arrive. Due to additional weather delays, the helicopters were not able to arrive in time and the field season was cancelled.

In 2013-2014, the British Antarctic Survey mapped 1,000 kilometres (620 mi) of the ice sheet with ground-based radar. The expedition used tractor-traverse, a group of vehicles and sledges, to transport both the scientists and the equipment. Ice cores were sampled during this expedition, which showed that the retreat of the glacier started in the 1940s.

=== From the sea ===
The first ship to reach Pine Island Glacier's ice shelf, in Pine Island Bay, was the USS/USCGC Glacier in 1985. This ship was an icebreaker operated by the U.S. Coast Guard. The mission, known as Deep Freeze, had scientists on board who took sediment samples from the ocean floor.

During the summer field season, over two months from January to February 2009, researchers aboard the U.S. Antarctic Program research vessel Nathaniel B. Palmer reached the ice shelf. This was the second time that the Palmer had successfully made it up to the glacier, the first time being in 1994. In collaboration with the British, the scientists used a robotic submarine to explore the glacier-carved channels on the continental shelf as well as the cavity below the ice shelf and glacier. The submarine, known as Autosub 3, was developed and built at the National Oceanography Centre in the UK. It completed six successful missions, travelling a total of 500 km (310 mi) under the ice shelf. Autosub is able to map the base of the ice shelf as well as the ocean floor and take various measurements and samples of the water on the way. The success of Autosub 3 was particularly notable because its predecessor Autosub 2 was lost beneath the Fimbul Ice Shelf on only its second such mission.

In 2012, sea temperature measurements during a strong La Nina showed reduced melting due to cooler water temperatures. This study showed that ice shelf retreat is sensitive to climate variability.

=== Aerial and satellite observations ===
Due to the remoteness of Pine Island Glacier, most of the information available on the ice stream comes from airborne or satellite-based measurements.

In the 2004–2005 field season a British Antarctic Survey (BAS) Twin Otter aircraft equipped with ice-penetrating radar, completed an aerial survey of PIG and its adjacent ice sheet. The team flew 30 km grid patterns over the PIG until January 18, mapping the sub-glacial terrain of over an area of approximately 500,000 square kilometres (190,000 sq mi).

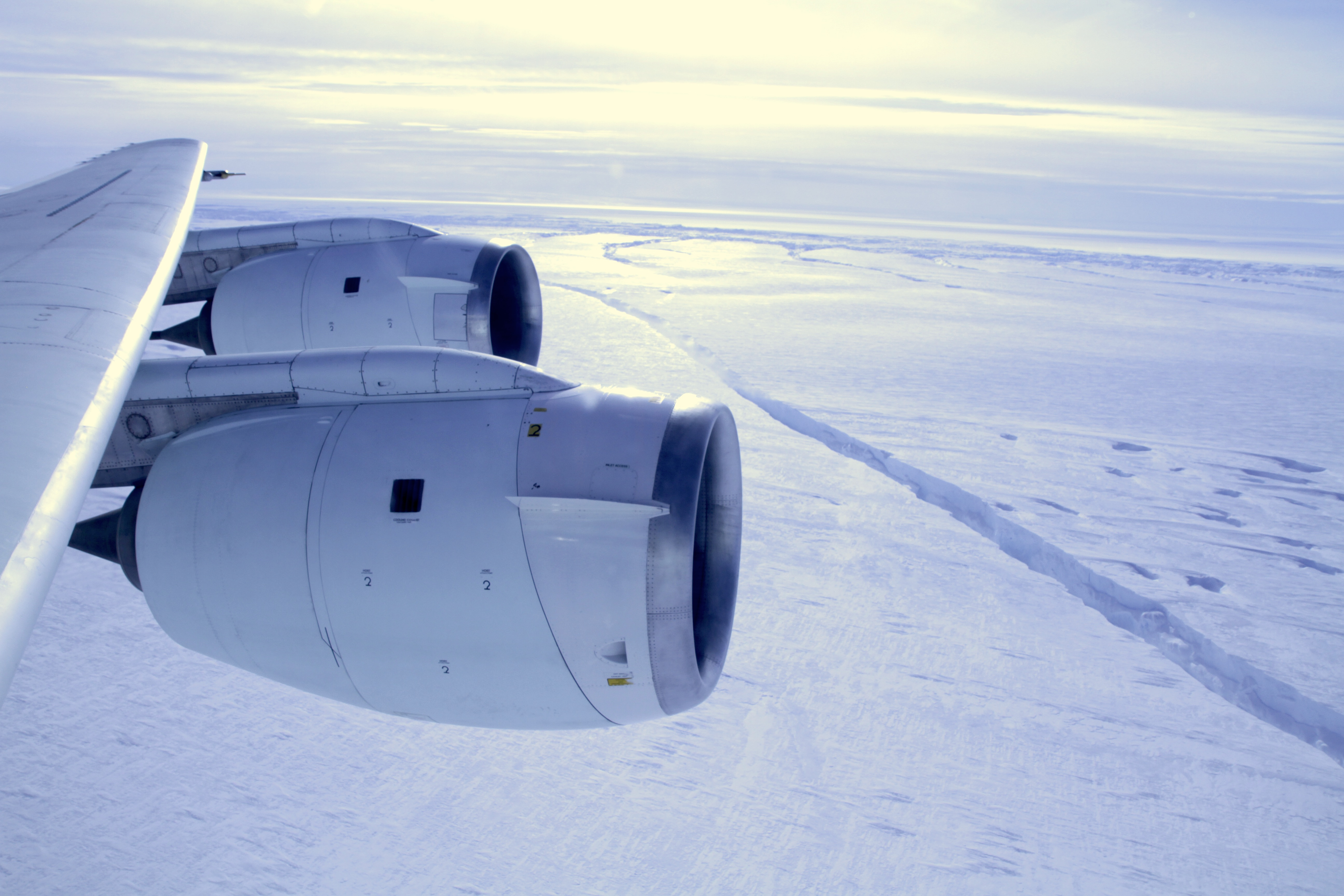
Crack in the ice as seen by IceBridge aerial survey

Pine Island Glacier was one target of the NASA IceBridge aerial missions from 2009 through 2019. The IceBridge aircraft carried a number of instruments, including laser altimeters, radars, gravimeter, and a magnetometer. In 2011, the IceBridge survey discovered a large crack in the ice sheet. The IceBridge mission was eventually replaced by the IceSat-2 satellite. IceSat-2 has been tracking the elevation of the surface of the glacier every 91 days since 2019.

The extensive calving of Pine Island Glacier from 2015 onwards was tracked with the Terra MODIS instrument (through 2019) and via the Landsat 8 and Sentinel-1 satellites. Other specialized satellites, such as the TerraSAR-X, have been used to measure fractures in the glacier and ice sheet.

=== Subglacial volcano ===
In January 2008, British Antarctic Survey (BAS) scientists reported that 2,200 years ago a volcano erupted under the Antarctic ice sheet. This was the biggest Antarctic eruption in the last 10,000 years. The volcano is situated in the Hudson Mountains, close to Pine Island Glacier. The eruption spread a layer of volcanic ash and tephra over the surface of the ice sheet. This ash was then buried under the snow and ice. The date of the eruption was estimated from the depth of burial of the ash. This method uses dates calculated from nearby ice cores. The presence of the volcano raises the possibility that volcanic activity could have contributed, or may contribute in the future, to increases in the flow of the glacier. In 2018 it was found that there is a substantial volcanic heat source beneath Pine Island Glacier approximately half as large as the active Grimsvötn volcano on Iceland. The same year a study was published concluding that the bedrock below WAIS was uplifted at a higher rate than previously thought, the authors suggested this could eventually help to stabilize the ice sheet.

== Climate engineering ==
Pine Island Glacier, as well as the better known Thwaites Glacier, can both substantially exacerbate future sea level rise. Consequently, some scientists, most notably Michael J. Wolovick and John C. Moore, have suggested stabilizing them via climate engineering aiming to block warm water flows from the ocean. Their first proposal focused on Thwaites, and estimated that even reinforcing it physically at weakest points, without building larger structures to block water flows, would be among "the largest civil engineering projects that humanity has ever attempted", yet only 30% likely to work.

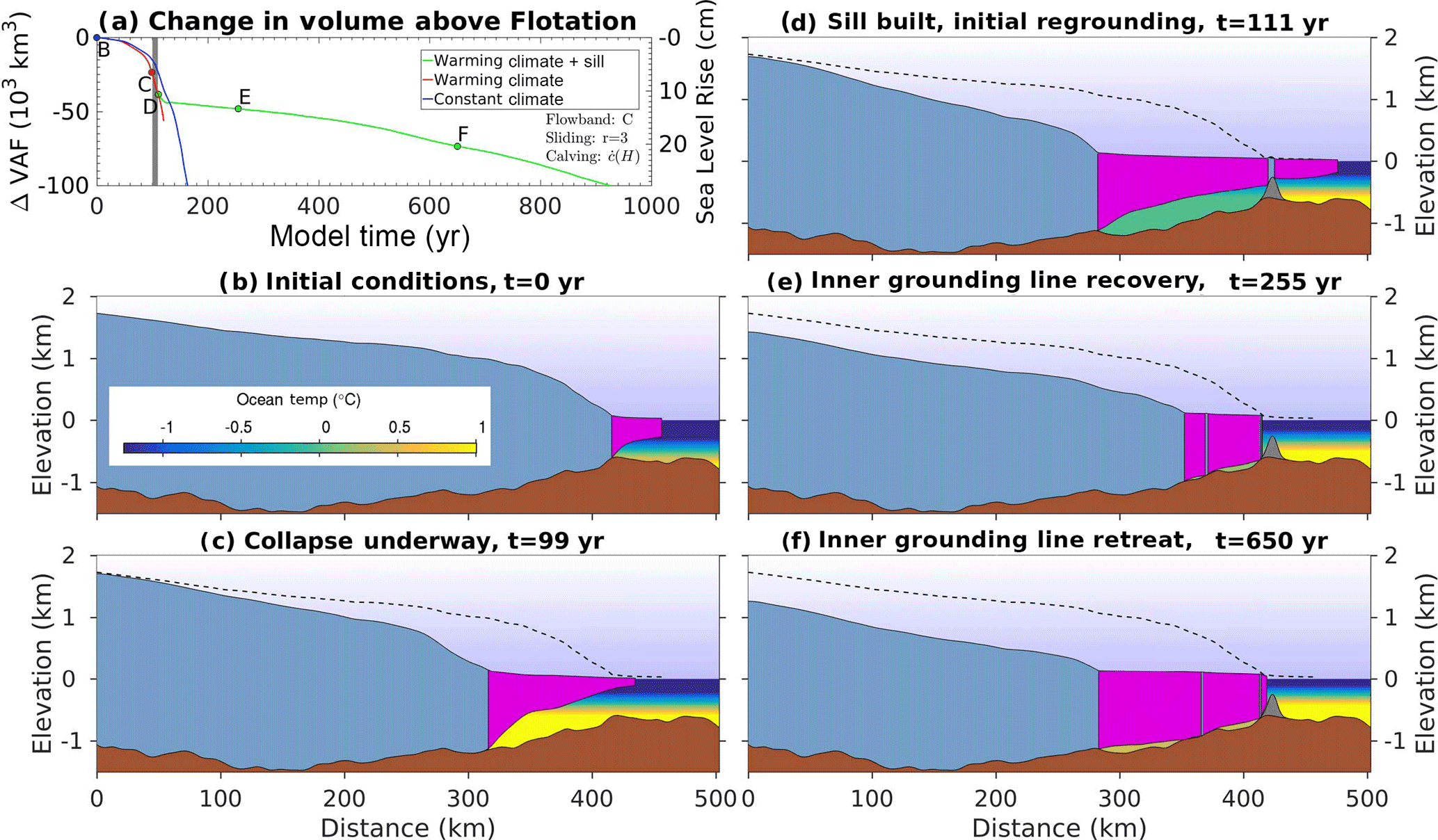
A proposed "underwater sill" blocking 50% of warm water flows heading for the glacier could have the potential to delay its collapse and the resultant sea level rise by many centuries.

== See also ==
- List of Antarctic ice streams
- List of glaciers in the Antarctic
- Sif Island
