= Pranke Island =

Island in Marie Byrd Land, Antarctica

- Location within Antarctica

Geography
- Location: Russell Bay
- Coordinates: 73°14′S 124°55′W

Administration
- ATA

Pranke Island is a small ice-covered island lying close to Siple Island in the west extremity of Russell Bay, off the coast of Marie Byrd Land. Mapped by United States Geological Survey (USGS) from ground surveys and U.S. Navy air photos, 1959–65. Named by Advisory Committee on Antarctic Names (US-ACAN) for James B. Pranke, aurora researcher at Byrd Station in 1965.

== See also ==
- List of Antarctic and sub-Antarctic islands
