= Nathaniel B. Palmer (icebreaker) =

Research vessel built in 1992

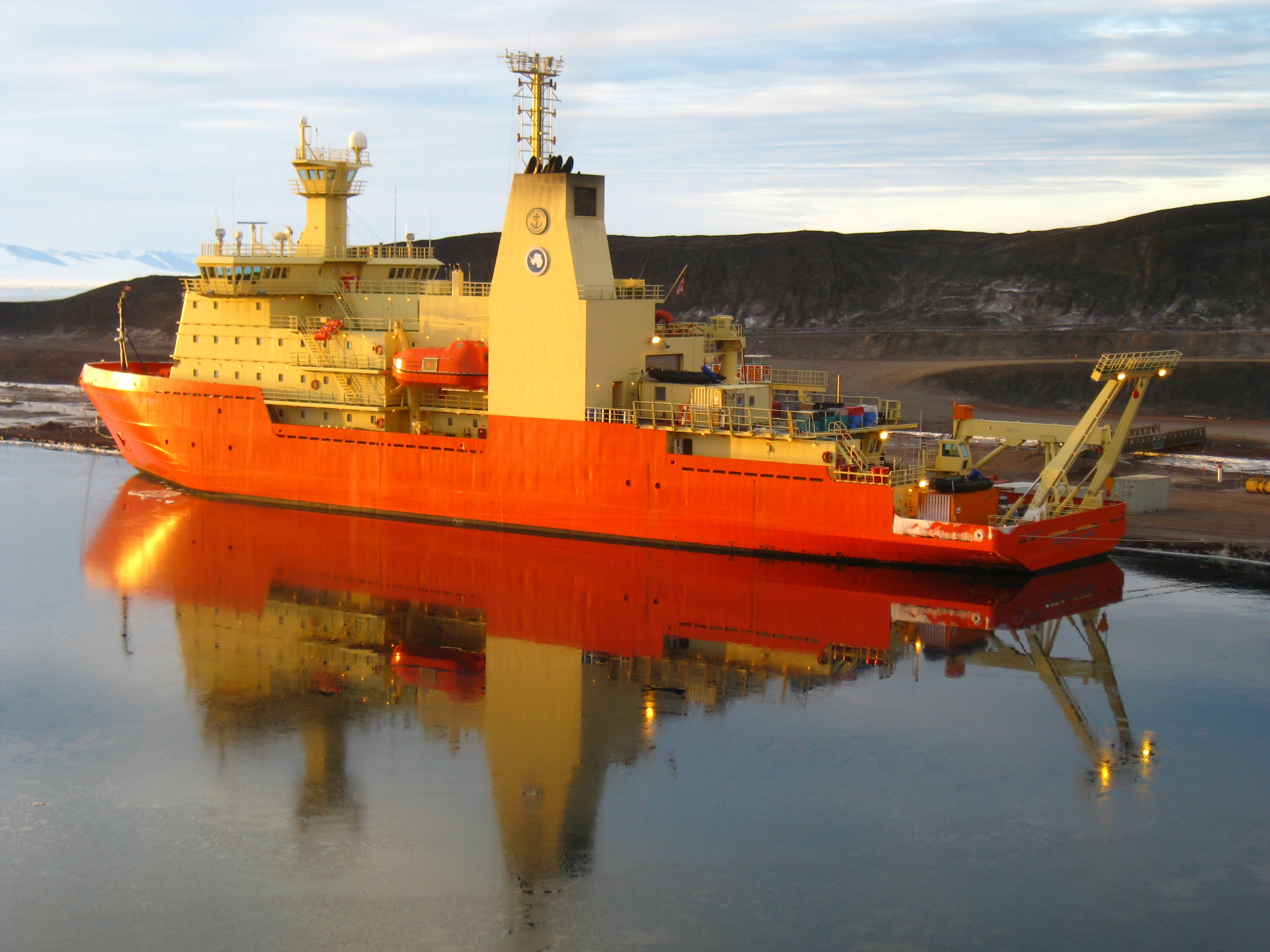
- Icebreaker Nathaniel B. Palmer, serving the National Science Foundation.

History

United States
- Namesake: Nathaniel Palmer
- Owner: Offshore Service Vessels LLC
- Operator: Lockheed Martin Antarctic Support Contract
- Builder: North American Shipbuilding Company
- Yard number: 137
- Launched: 1992
- In service: 1992
- Home port: Punta Arenas, Patagonia
- Identification: IMO number: 9007257; MMSI number: 366610000; Callsign: WBP3210
- Status: In service

General characteristics
- Type: Research vessel
- Tonnage: 6,174 GT
- Length: 94 m (308 ft)
- Beam: 18.3 m (60 ft)
- Height: NDL
- Draft: 6.8 m (22 ft)
- Depth: 9.1 m (30 ft)
- Ice class: ABS A2
- Installed power: 4 × Caterpillar 3608
- Propulsion: Main propulsion: 12,720 hp (9,485 kW); Bow Thruster: 1,400 hp (1,040 kW); Stern Thruster: 800 hp (600 kW)
- Endurance: 65 days
- Complement: 67
- Crew: 22
- Aircraft carried: helicopter

Nathaniel B. Palmer is an icebreaking research vessel (RVIB) owned by Offshore Service Vessels LLC, operated by Edison Chouest Offshore, Inc. From its launch in 1992 until 2025 it was chartered by the United States National Science Foundation (NSF). Nathaniel B. Palmer and tasked with extended scientific missions in the Antarctic.

Nathaniel B. Palmer was purpose-built for and delivered to the NSF by Edison Chouest Offshore's North American Shipbuilding facility in 1992. Nathaniel B. Palmer was able to support up to two helicopters, accommodated up to 45 science and technical personnel, had a crew of 22 and was capable of missions lasting up to 65 days. The vessel was named after merchant mariner and ship builder Nathaniel Brown Palmer, credited by some historians as the first American to see Antarctica.

The vessel was capable of accessing some of the most ice-heavy areas of the Antarctic, that smaller icebreakers were not capable of. Along with ice-breaking, the ship could perform mooring operations, seafloor dredging, and water sampling. It could also deploy autonomous unmanned aerial and underwater systems. The Palmer can support the operation of a pair of helicopters as well, but deployed helicopters just three times between 1992 and 2025.

In February 2020, researchers aboard the vessel with the international Thwaites Glacier Offshore Research (THOR) project discovered Sif Island, located in Pine Island Bay of the Amundsen Sea, in Antarctica.

In 2025, the Trump administration proposed a 55% budget cut to the National Science Foundation which consequently ended the lease with the Nathaniel B. Palmer. This left the United States Antarctic Program without an Antarctic research vessel for the first time in nearly 60 years. The ship returned to Louisiana in November 2025.

== Gallery ==
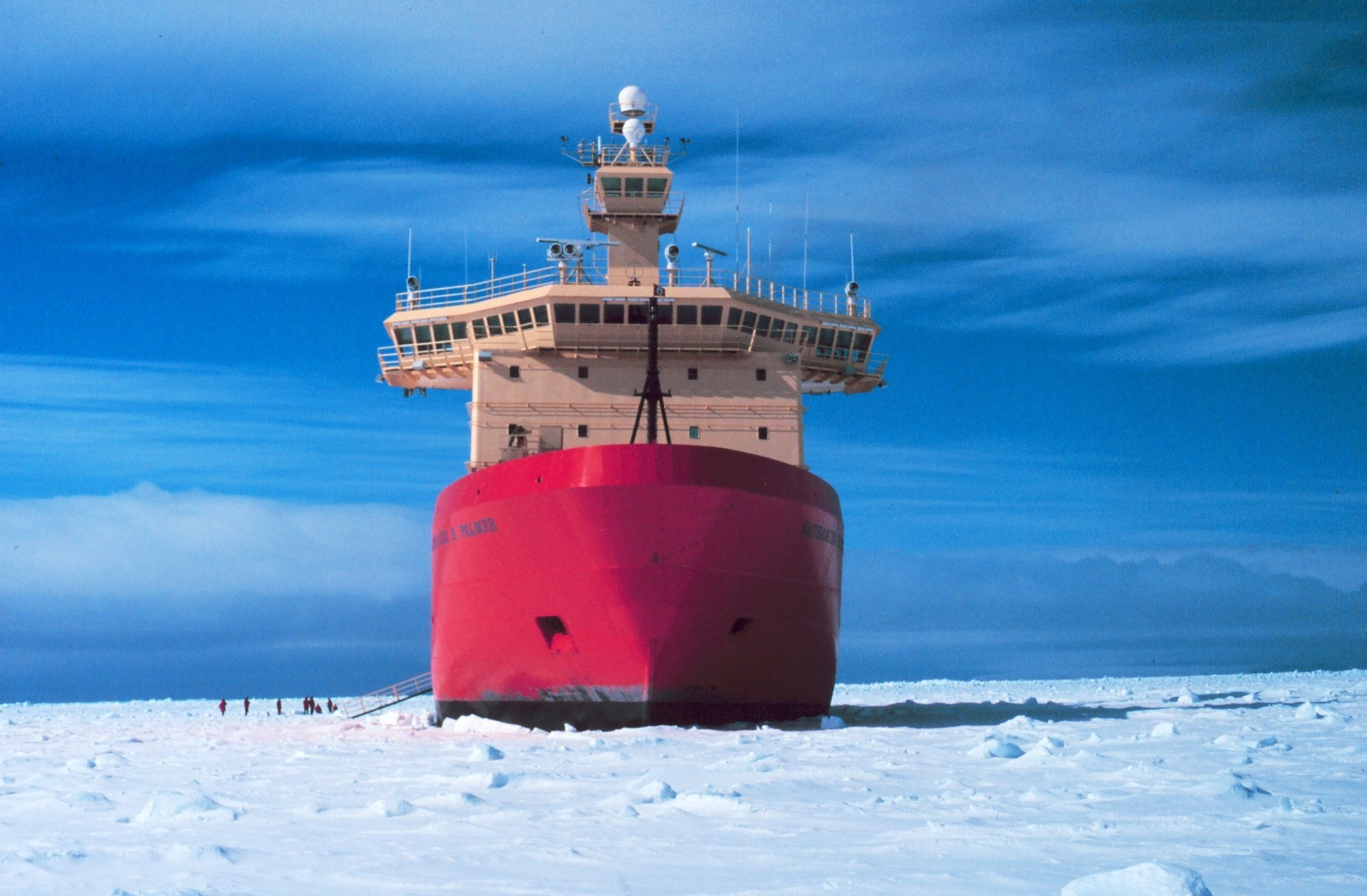
Nathaniel B. Palmer

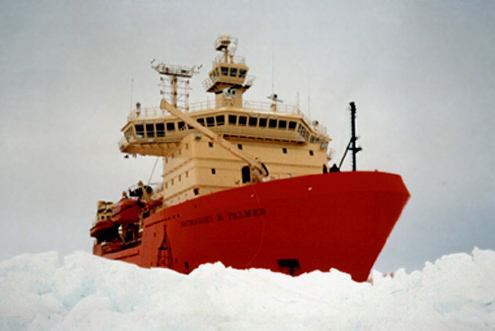
