= Amundsen Sea =

Arm of the Southern Ocean

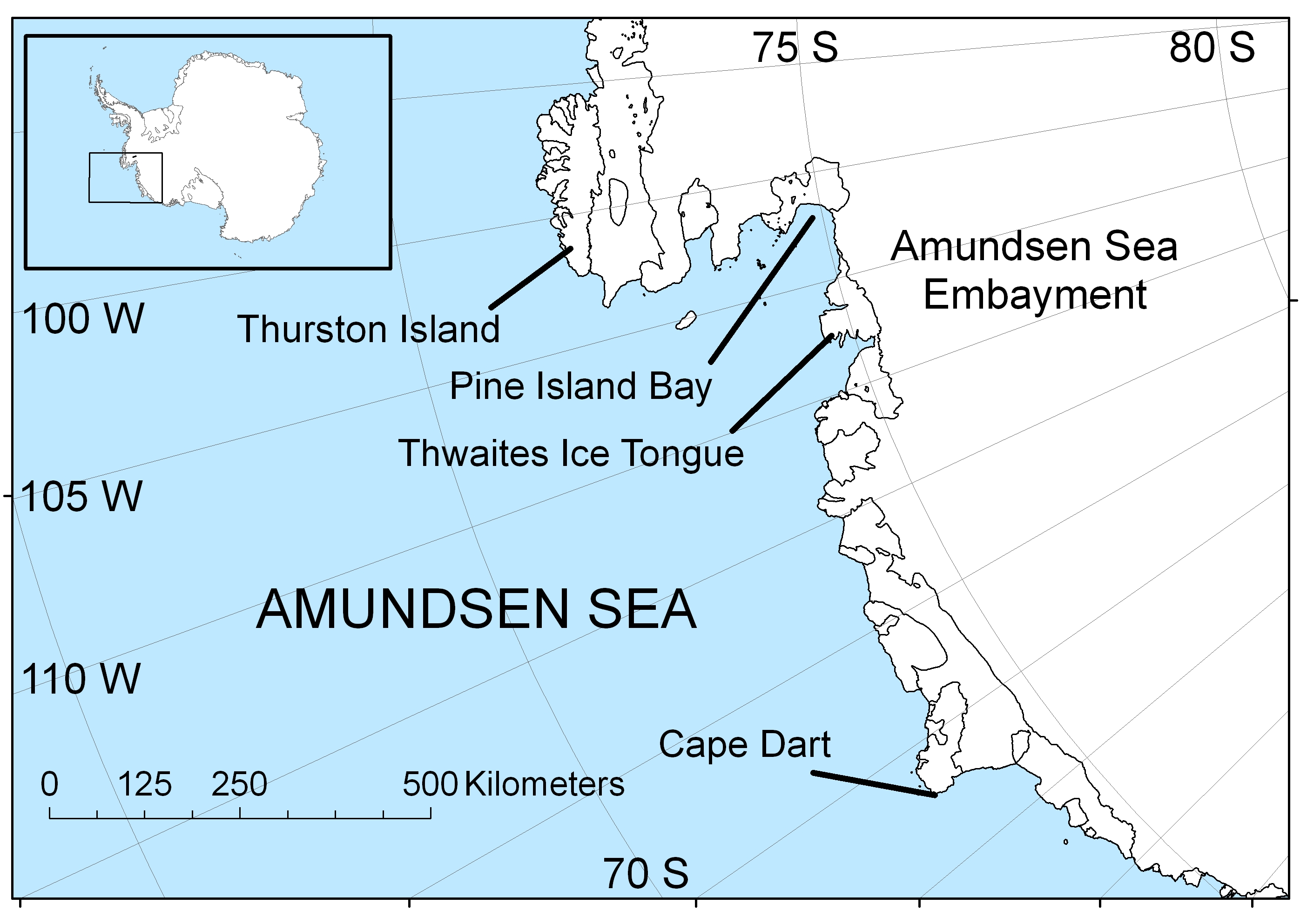
The Amundsen Sea area of Antarctica

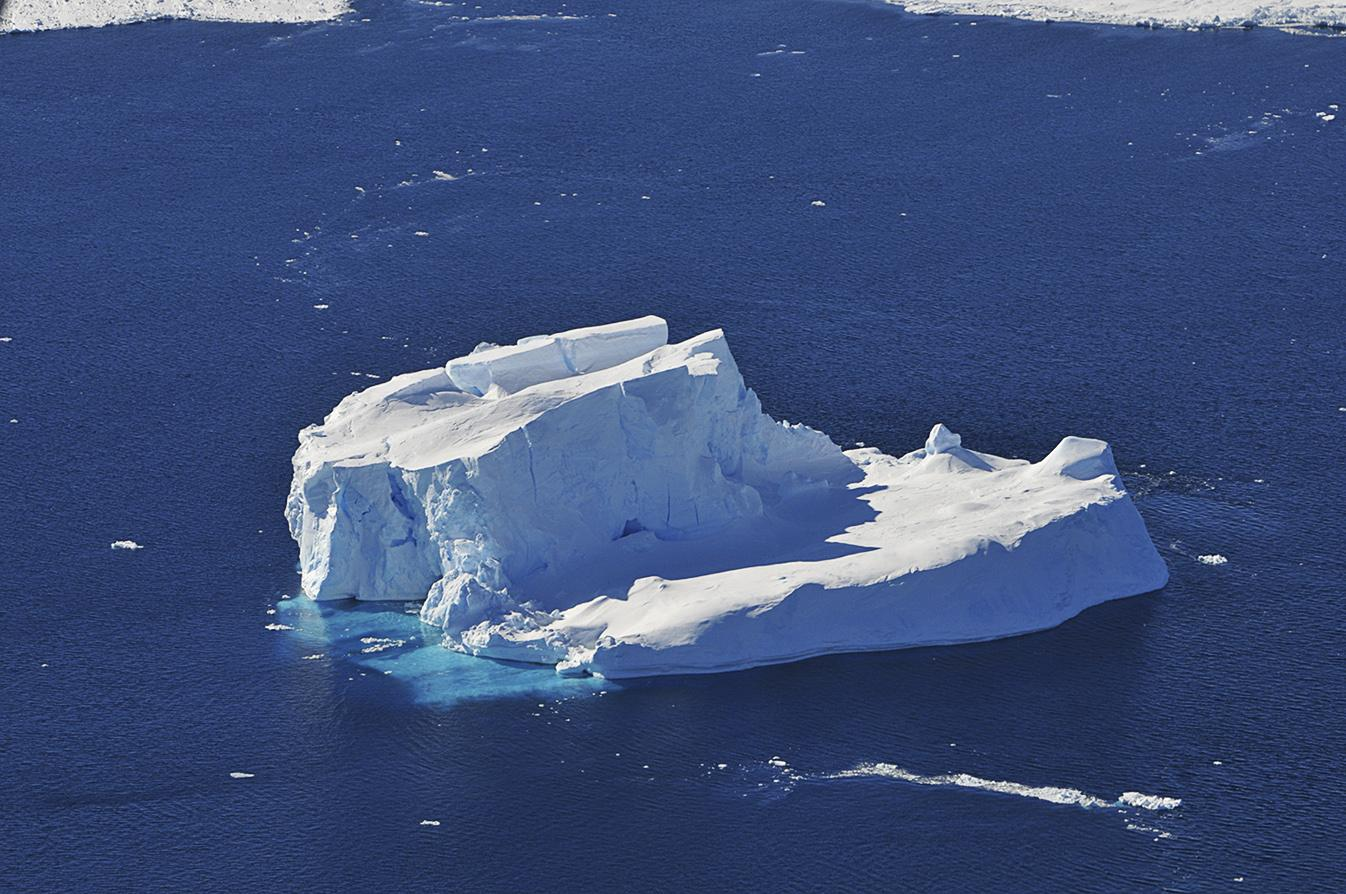
Antarctic iceberg floating in the Amundsen Sea water, October 2009.

The Amundsen Sea is an arm of the Southern Ocean off Marie Byrd Land in western Antarctica. It lies between Cape Flying Fish (the northwestern tip of Thurston Island) to the east and Cape Dart on Siple Island to the west. Cape Flying Fish marks the boundary between the Amundsen Sea and the Bellingshausen Sea. West of Cape Dart there is no named marginal sea of the Southern Ocean between the Amundsen and Ross Seas. The Norwegian expedition of 1928–1929 under Captain Nils Larsen named the body of water for the Norwegian polar explorer Roald Amundsen while exploring this area in February 1929.

The sea is mostly ice-covered, and the Thwaites Ice Tongue protrudes into it. The ice sheet which drains into the Amundsen Sea averages about 3 km (1.9 mi) in thickness; roughly the size of the state of Texas, this area is known as the Amundsen Sea Embayment (ASE); it forms one of the three major ice-drainage basins of the West Antarctic Ice Sheet.

== Embayment ==
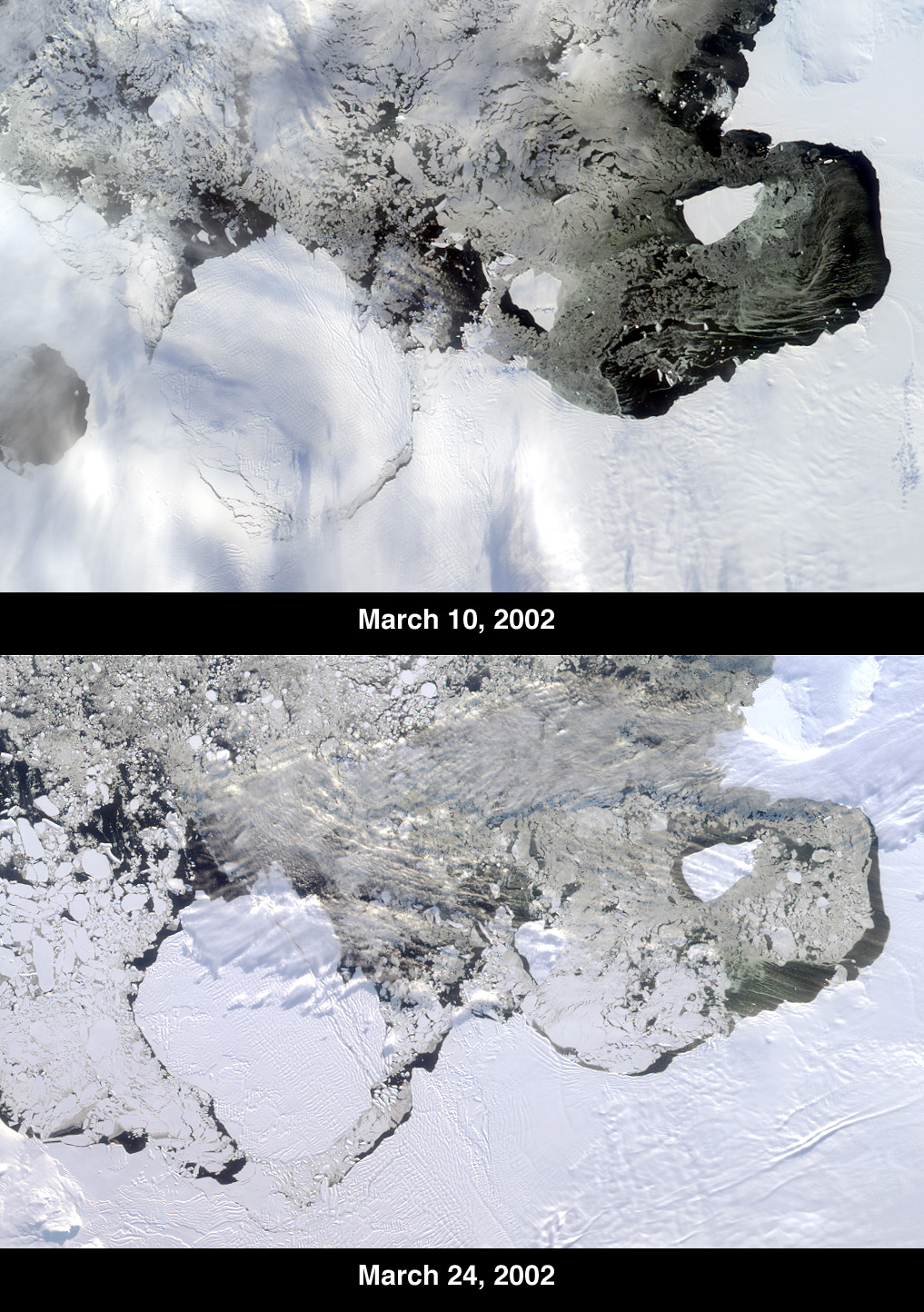
Large B-22 iceberg breaking off from Thwaites Glacier and remnants of the B-21 iceberg from Pine Island Glacier in Pine Island Bay to the right of the image

The ice sheet that drains into the Amundsen Sea averages about 3 km (1.9 mi) in thickness. It is roughly the size of the state of Texas and is known as the Amundsen Sea Embayment (ASE); it forms one of the three major ice drainage basins of the West Antarctic Ice Sheet along with the Ross Sea Embayment and the Weddell Sea Embayment.

Some scientists proposed that this region may be a weak underbelly of the West Antarctic Ice Sheet. The Pine Island and Thwaites Glaciers, which both flow into the Amundsen Sea, are two of Antarctica's largest five. Researchers reported that the flow of these glaciers increased starting in the mid-2000s; if they were to melt completely, global sea levels would rise by about 0.9–1.9 meters (3.0–6.2 feet). Other researchers suggested that the loss of these glaciers would destabilise the entire West Antarctic ice sheet and possibly sections of the East Antarctic Ice Sheet.

A 2004 study suggested that because the ice in the Amundsen Sea had been melting rapidly and was riven with cracks, the offshore ice shelf was set to collapse "within five years". The study projected a sea level rise of 1.3 m (4.3 ft) from the West Antarctic Ice Sheet if all the sea ice in the Amundsen Sea melted.

Measurements made by the British Antarctic Survey in 2005 showed that the ice discharge rate into the Amundsen Sea embayment was about 250 km^{3} per year. Assuming a steady rate of discharge, this alone was sufficient to raise global sea levels by 0.2 mm per year.

A subglacial volcano was detected just north of the Pine Island Glacier near the Hudson Mountains. It last erupted approximately 2,200 years ago, indicated by widespread ash deposits within the ice, in what was the largest known eruption in Antarctica within the prior 10 millennia. Volcanic activity may be contributing to the observed increase of glacial flow, although the most popular theory is that the flow has increased due to warming ocean water. This water has warmed due to an upwelling of deep ocean water due to variations in pressure systems, which could have been affected by global warming.

Amundsen Sea as part of the Southern Ocean

In January 2010, a modelling study suggested that the "tipping point" for Pine Island Glacier may have been passed in 1996, with a retreat of 200 kilometers (120 miles) possible by 2100, producing a corresponding 24 cm (0.79 ft) of sea level rise. It was suggested that these estimates were conservative. The modelling study also stated that "Given the complex, three-dimensional nature of the real Pine Island glacier ... it should be clear that the [...] model is a very crude representation of reality."

A 2023 study estimated that the area lost 3.3 trillion tons of ice between 1996 and 2021, raising sea levels by 9 millimeters.

== Pine Island Bay ==
Pine Island Bay (74°50′S 102°40′W) is a bay about 40 miles (64 km) long and 30 miles (48 km) wide, into which flows the ice of the Pine Island Glacier at the southeast extremity of the Amundsen Sea. It was delineated from aerial photographs taken by United States Navy (USN) Operation HIGHJUMP in December 1946, and named by the Advisory Committee on Antarctic Names for the USS Pine Island, seaplane tender and flagship of the eastern task group of USN Operation HIGHJUMP which explored this area.

== Russell Bay ==
Russell Bay (73°27′S 123°54′W) is a rather open bay in southwestern Amundsen Sea, extending along the north sides of Siple Island, Getz Ice Shelf and Carney Island, from Pranke Island to Cape Gates. It was mapped by the United States Geological Survey from surveys and USN air photos, 1959–66, and named by the Advisory Committee on Antarctic Names for Admiral James S. Russell, Vice Chief of Naval Operations during the post 1957–58 IGY period.

== Climate engineering ==
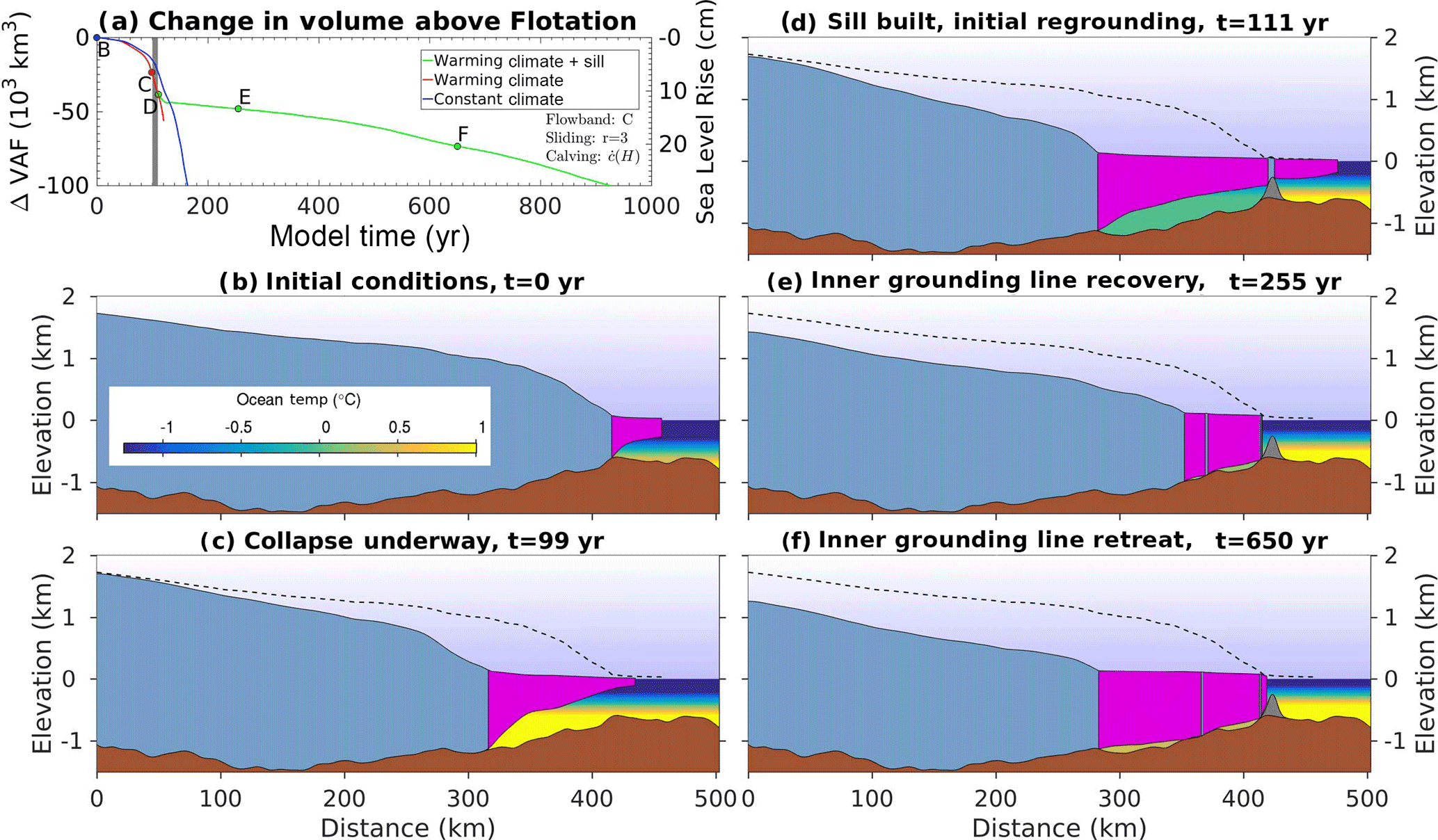
A proposed "underwater sill" blocking 50% of warm water flows heading for the glacier could have the potential to delay its collapse and the resultant sea level rise by many centuries.

Some engineering interventions have been proposed for Thwaites Glacier and the nearby Pine Island Glacier to physically stabilize its ice or to preserve it. These interventions would block the flow of warm ocean water, which currently renders the collapse of these two glaciers practically inevitable even without further warming. A proposal from 2018 included building sills at the Thwaites' grounding line to either physically reinforce it, or to block some fraction of warm water flow. The former would be the simplest intervention, yet equivalent to "the largest civil engineering projects that humanity has ever attempted". It is also only 30% likely to work. Constructions blocking even 50% of the warm water flow are expected to be far more effective, yet far more difficult as well. Some researchers argued that this proposal could be ineffective, or even accelerate sea level rise. The authors of the original proposal suggested attempting this intervention on smaller sites, like the Jakobshavn Glacier in Greenland, as a test. They also acknowledged that this intervention cannot prevent sea level rise from the increased ocean heat content, and would be ineffective in the long run without greenhouse gas emission reductions.

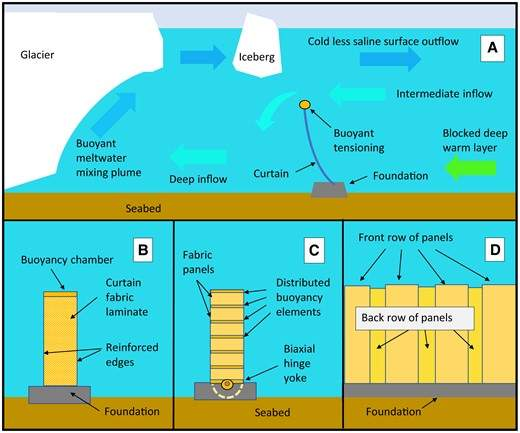
Diagram of a proposed "curtain"

In 2023, it was proposed that an installation of underwater curtains, made of a flexible material and anchored to the Amundsen Sea floor would be able to interrupt warm water flow. This approach would reduce costs and increase the longevity of the material (conservatively estimated at 25 years for curtain elements and up to 100 years for the foundations) relative to more rigid structures. With them in place, Thwaites Ice Shelf and Pine Island Ice Shelf would possibly regrow to a state they last had a century ago, thus stabilizing these glaciers. To achieve this, the curtains would have to be placed at a depth of around 600 m (0.37 mi) (to avoid damage from icebergs which would be regularly drifting above) and be 80 km (50 mi) long. The authors acknowledged that while work on this scale would be unprecedented and face many challenges in the Antarctic (including polar night and the currently insufficient numbers of specialized polar ships and underwater vessels), it would also not require new technology and there is experience of laying pipelines at such depths.

The authors estimated this project would take a decade to construct, at $40–80 billion initial cost, while the ongoing maintenance would cost $1–2 billion a year. Yet, a single seawall capable of protecting the entire New York City may cost twice as much on its own, and the global costs of adaptation to sea level rise caused by the glaciers' collapse are estimated to reach $40 billion annually: The authors also suggested that their proposal would be competitive with the other climate engineering proposals like stratospheric aerosol injection (SAI) or carbon dioxide removal (CDR), as while those would stop a much larger spectrum of climate change impacts, their estimated annual costs range from $7–70 billion for SAI to $160–4,500 billion for CDR powerful enough to help meet the 1.5 °C (2.7 °F) Paris Agreement target.
