= Maish =

Maish may refer to:

== People ==
- Levi Maish (1837–1899), American politician
- Steve Maish (born 1963), English darts player

== Places ==
- Maish House, United States
- Maish Nunatak, Antarctica
- Maish Vaya, Arizona, United States
