= Ruth Mottram =

British climatologist (born 1978)

- Born: 1978; United Kingdom
- Other name: Ruth H. Mottram
- Education: University of Edinburgh (MA, 2000); University of Edinburgh (MRes); University of St Andrews (PhD, 2008)
- Employer: Danish Meteorological Institute
- Title: Senior Climate Scientist
- Website: sternaparadisaea.net

Ruth Helen Mottram (born 1978) is a British and Danish climate scientist and glaciologist who serves as a Senior Climate Scientist at the Danish Meteorological Institute (DMI) and Honorary Professor at Aarhus University's Department of Environmental Science. She is a recognized expert on the Greenland ice sheet and Antarctic ice sheet, climate modelling, and ice sheet–atmosphere interactions. Mottram is a contributing author to the IMBIE team, whose work quantifying ice sheet loss has been published in Nature and other high-impact journals. She was also a contributing author to the IPCC's fifth assessment report on Greenland mass budget and her work on Antarctic ice sheet mass budget was the basis of figure showing this in the working group 1 of the IPCC Sixth Assessment Report. She is frequently cited in international media as an expert on Arctic climate change and contributes annual updates on the state of the Greenland ice sheet to Carbon Brief.

Her research focuses on developing regional climate models (particularly HIRHAM and HCLIM) to understand ice sheet surface mass balance, glacier dynamics, and the impacts of climate change on polar regions. Mottram is a member of the Polar Portal team, which provides near real-time monitoring of the Arctic cryosphere, and contributes to the European Space Agency's Climate Change Initiative for the Greenland ice sheet.

== Early life and education ==
Mottram studied geography at the University of Edinburgh, earning a master of art's degree in 2000. She then completed a Master of Research in the natural environment, where her research on tor formation and the exposure history of the Cairngorm Plateau utilized cosmogenic beryllium-10 and aluminium-26 to date terrestrial landforms and quantify bedrock erosion rates. After working briefly in exploration at Shell, she pursued a doctorate in glaciology at the University of St Andrews. Her PhD research, completed in 2008, tested theories of crevasse formation on glaciers and developed a widely used parameterization for calving in ice sheet models.

== Research and career ==
Mottram initially developed the use of the regional atmospheric climate model HIRHAM5, which combines HIRLAM (High Resolution Limited Area Model) and ECHAM (a global climate model), to study surface mass balance and interactions between the atmosphere and ice sheets. Based at the Danish Meteorological Institute since 2009, she primarily researches polar climate processes and contributes to the World Climate Research Programme's CORDEX initiative, producing regional climate simulations for the Arctic and Antarctic.

Since 2020, Mottram has been part of the HCLIM consortium, developing the HARMONIE-Climate model, one of a new generation of flexible atmospheric climate models capable of operating at scales from tens of kilometres down to hundreds of metres. She is a core member of the Polar Portal team, which carries out near real-time monitoring of the Arctic cryosphere, including live updates of satellite datasets tracking sea ice, icebergs, permafrost, and a daily updated Greenland ice sheet surface mass balance dataset.

As a scientist working within the European Space Agency's Climate Change Initiative for the Greenland ice sheet, Mottram has contributed to IMBIE, a major international effort to quantify ice sheet mass loss. The IMBIE team's 2019 Nature paper, of which she was a co-author, established that the Greenland Ice Sheet lost 3,800 billion tonnes of ice between 1992 and 2018, contributing approximately 10.6 millimeters to global sea level rise. She has published extensively on comparing satellite observations with climate model outputs to assess ice sheet evolution.

Mottram's research on Antarctic surface mass balance includes intercomparisons of regional climate model estimates to assess ice sheet mass changes, as published in her 2021 study in The Cryosphere.. She leads the EU partners in the Horizon Europe project OCEAN:ICE and is principal investigator in the ESA project PISCO, both advancing understanding of polar ice sheets and climate dynamics. She has also contributed to palaeoclimate studies at Kangiata Nunaata Sermia, a major tidewater glacier in south west Greenland, where sedimentary sequences showing the glacier advanced 15 km during the 12th century were identified.. Her research on numerical models of crevasse depths led to a widely adopted technique for estimating calving frequency in ice sheet models.

In addition to her research, Mottram is a frequent expert commentator in international media on Polar climate change. She has been interviewed by BBC radio and cited by The Guardian, AP News, and EUobserver. She contributes annual scientific updates on the state of the Greenland ice sheet to Carbon Brief, including reports that Greenland lost 105 billion tonnes of ice in 2024–25, continuing a trend of nearly three decades of continuous annual ice loss.

"The sea ice surrounding Greenland is also changing. It is thinner, it breaks up earlier, and opens up more frequently."
— Ruth Mottram, on Arctic climate change impacts

== Selected publications ==
- IMBIE Team (2019). "Mass balance of the Greenland Ice Sheet from 1992 to 2018". Nature. 579 (7798): 233–239. Bibcode:2019Natur.579..233I. doi:10.1038/S41586-019-1855-2. hdl:20.500.11820/fd3f858e-c5d8-4cfc-9120-4e0ad060c556. PMID 31822019.
- Mottram, R.; Hansen, N.; Hogg, A. E. (2025). "The Greenlandification of Antarctica". Nature Geoscience. 18: 928–930. doi:10.1038/s41561-025-01805-1.
- Otosaka, Inès N.; Horwath, Martin; Mottram, Ruth; Nowicki, Sophie (2023). "Mass balances of the Antarctic and Greenland ice sheets monitored from space". Surveys in Geophysics. doi:10.1007/s10712-023-09795-8.
- Benn, Douglas I.; Warren, Charles R.; Mottram, Ruth H. (2007). "Calving processes and the dynamics of calving glaciers". Earth-Science Reviews. 82 (3–4): 143–179. Bibcode:2007ESRv...82..143B. doi:10.1016/J.EARSCIREV.2007.02.002. ISSN 0012-8252.
- Benn, Douglas I.; Hulton, Nicholas R.J.; Mottram, Ruth H. (2007). "'Calving laws', 'sliding laws' and the stability of tidewater glaciers". Annals of Glaciology. 46: 123–130. Bibcode:2007AnGla..46..123B. doi:10.3189/172756407782871161. hdl:20.500.11820/809ac3d5-35ba-47dc-b2b8-342bfa06a457. ISSN 0260-3055.
- Mottram, Ruth (2008). Processes of crevasse formation and the dynamics of calving glaciers: a study at Breiðamerkurjökull (Thesis). University of St Andrews. hdl:10023/775. OCLC 1064564093.
- Mottram, R.; Simonsen, B. S.; Høyer Svendsen, S.; Barletta, V. R.; Sandberg Sørensen, L.; Nagler, T.; Wuite, J.; Groh, A.; Horwath, M.; Rosier, J.; Solgaard, A.; Hvidberg, C. S.; Forsberg, R. (2019). "An Integrated View of Greenland Ice Sheet Mass Changes Based on Models and Satellite Observations". Remote Sensing. 11 (12): 1407. doi:10.3390/rs11121407.
- Mottram, R.; Hansen, N.; Kittel, C.; van Wessem, J. M.; Agosta, C.; Amory, C.; Boberg, F.; van de Berg, W. J.; Fettweis, X.; Gossart, A.; van Lipzig, N. P. M.; van Meijgaard, E.; Orr, A.; Phillips, T.; Webster, S.; Simonsen, S. B.; Souverijns, N. (2021). "What is the surface mass balance of Antarctica? An intercomparison of regional climate model estimates". The Cryosphere. 15: 3751–3784. doi:10.5194/tc-15-3751-2021.
