= Lucchitta Glacier =

Glacier in Antarctica

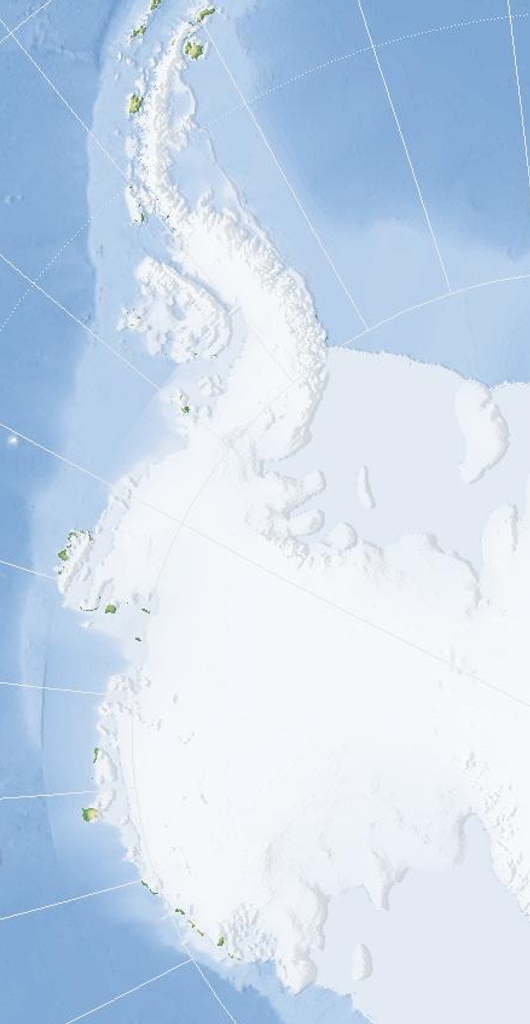
- West Antarctica

- Location within Antarctica
- Location: Ellsworth Land
- Coordinates: 74°24′00″S 99°56′00″W
- Length: 20 nautical miles (37 km; 23 mi)
- Thickness: unknown
- Terminus: Pine Island Bay
- Status: unknown

Lucchitta Glacier (74°24′S 99°56′W) is a glacier about 20 nautical miles (37 km) long flowing south from the Hudson Mountains of Antarctica into Pine Island Bay. It was named by the Advisory Committee on Antarctic Names after geologist Baerbel K. Lucchitta of the United States Geological Survey, Flagstaff, Arizona, a specialist in the use of satellite imagery for geological and glaciological studies from the early 1980s to the early 2000s (decade), and one of the pioneers in the use of imagery for glacier velocity measurements in Antarctica.

== See also ==
- List of glaciers in the Antarctic
- Glaciology
