= Baerbel Lucchitta =

Astrogeologist, scientist emeritus

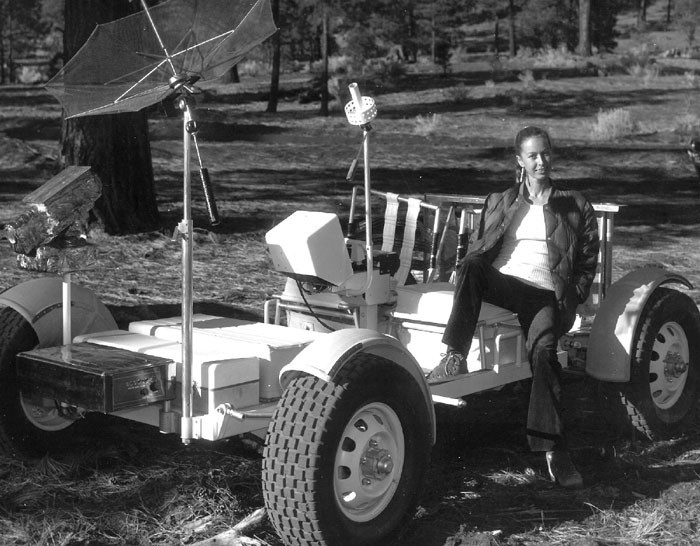
- Dr. Baerbel K. Lucchitta at the Cinder Field, Fall 1972, before the Apollo 17 mission.
- Born: October 2, 1938 (age 87); Münster
- Education: Kent State University; Pennsylvania State University
- Spouse: Ivo Lucchitta (m. 1964)
- Scientific career
- Workplaces: United States Geological Survey; Northern Arizona University

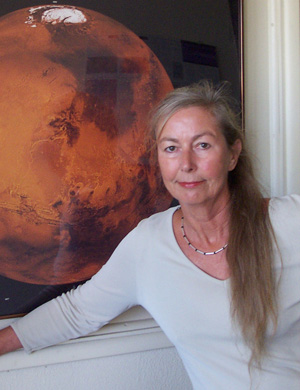
USGS photo

Baerbel Kösters Lucchitta (October 2, 1938, Münster, Germany) is a scientist emeritus at the Astrogeology Science Center at the USGS and one of the first women in the field of Astrogeology. She was one of the people responsible of making lunar maps for the Apollo 11 mission. During her career, she was dedicated to mapping the Moon, Mars, Europa and the Galilean Satellites, and Antarctica. The Lucchitta Glacier is named after her work in Antarctica, and the Asteroid 4569 Baerbel is named after her work in planetary geology.

== Life and career ==
Baerbel, née Koesters, is the second child of Bernhard and Fridel Koesters. She was born before the beginning of World War II, and her family had to move around out of fear of the war. Her father was a conscript soldier and later a war prisoner. He reunited with his family in Münster in 1947 after being released in England.

Baerbel attended a Catholic all-girl, public high school in Germany. After she graduated from school, she went to study geology.

She was awarded a Fulbright scholarship and moved into Kent State University in Ohio, where she earned a B.S. degree in Geology in 1961. She earned an assistantship position at Pennsylvania State University, and she received a M.S. degree in 1963 and in 1966 earned a Ph.D. in structural geology. She then moved to Flagstaff, and from 1967 to her retirement in 1995 she worked at the USGS. In 1995 she was named Scientist Emerita at the USGS. From 1995 to 2003 she was an Adjunct faculty member at Northern Arizona University.

She is known for her work in mapping and the use of satellite imagery for geological and glaciological studies. She is also known for her theories on the influence of ice in the geology of Mars.

She married geologist Ivo Lucchitta in 1964 with whom she has a daughter.

== Honors and awards ==
- Centennial Fellow, Department of Earth and Mineral Sciences, Pennsylvania State University (1996).
- G.K. Gilbert Award for the Planetary Geology Division, Geological Society of America (1995). She was the first woman to receive this award.
- U.S. Department of the Interior Meritorious Service Award (1994).
- USGS Special Achievement Award (1983).
- NASA Special Recognition Group Award, 10th Anniversary, Lunar Program (1979).
- Minor planet 4569 Baerbel is named in her honor
