= Porpoise Subglacial Highlands =

Subglacial highlands in Wilkes Land, Antarctica

Porpoise Subglacial Highlands (69°30′S 134°0′E) is a group of subglacial highlands to the west of Astrolabe Subglacial Basin, in the east part of Wilkes Land. The feature was delineated by the Scott Polar Research Institute (SPRI)-National Science Foundation (NSF)-Technical University of Denmark (TUD) airborne radio echo sounding program, 1967–79, and named after the Porpoise (Lieutenant C. Ringgold, USN), one of the ships of the United States Exploring Expedition, 1838-42 (Lieutenant Charles Wilkes, USN).
