= Astrolabe Needle =

Monolith in the British Antarctic Territory

Astrolabe Needle (64°8′S 62°36′W) is a conspicuous monolith rising 50 metres (160 ft) above sea level south of Claude Point, Brabant Island, in the Palmer Archipelago. It was discovered by the 1903–1905 French Antarctic Expedition under Jean-Baptiste Charcot and named after the Astrolabe, one of the ships of the 1837–1840 French expedition under Captain Jules Dumont d'Urville.
