= French ship Astrolabe (1811) =

French exploration ship launched in 1811

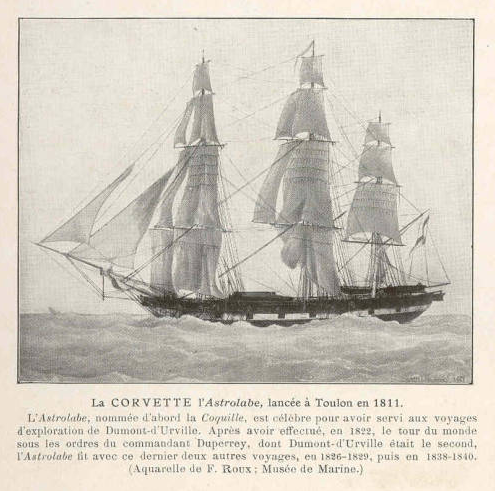

History

France
- Namesake: French ship Astrolabe
- Builder: Toulon shipyard
- Launched: 1811
- Christened: Coquille, 9 July 1814
- Renamed: Astrolabe in 1826
- Fate: Scrapped in 1851

General characteristics
- Class & type: Fluyt
- Displacement: 380 tonnes
- Length: 31.57 m (103.6 ft)
- Beam: 18.48 m (60.6 ft)
- Draught: 4.25 m (13.9 ft)
- Propulsion: Sail
- Crew: 11 officers & 72 men (1827)
- Armament: 12 guns (1827)

Astrolabe was originally a horse-transport barge converted into an exploration ship of the French Navy. Originally named Coquille, she is famous for her travels with Jules Dumont d'Urville. The name derives from an early navigational instrument, the astrolabe, a precursor to the sextant.

== Career ==
=== Voyage under the command of Louis Isidore Duperrey ===
Louis-Isidore Duperrey commanded Coquille on its circumnavigation of the earth (1822–1825) with Jules Dumont d'Urville as second. René-Primevère Lesson also travelled on Coquille as a naval doctor and naturalist. On their return in March 1825, Lesson and Dumont brought back to France an imposing collection of animals and plants collected on the Falkland Islands, on the coasts of Chile and Peru, in the archipelagos of the Pacific and New Zealand, New Guinea and Australia.

During the voyage the ship spent two weeks in the Bay of Islands in the north of New Zealand in 1824. The vessel arrived in Kosrae where Duperrey and his crew visited for ten days. On the return voyage to France the ship sailed through the Ellice Islands (now known as Tuvalu).

=== First Voyage under the command of Jules Dumont d'Urville ===
Coquille was renamed Astrolabe in honour of one of the ships of La Pérouse. She sailed from Toulon on 22 April 1826, towards the Pacific Ocean, for a circumnavigation of the world that was destined to last nearly three years.

Astrolabe explored parts of New Zealand. In January 1827, the French explorer Dumont d'Urville arrived in Tasman Bay in the north of the South Island. A number of landmarks around Tasman Bay were named by d'Urville and his crew including d'Urville Island, French Pass and Torrent Bay. Dumont then sailed along the east coast of the North Island. On 12 March 1827, Astrolabe entered the Bay of Islands.

On 19 December 1827 Astrolabe came into Hobart to repair, refresh, and seek out information relative to the wreck and remains of La Pérouse's shipwreck.

Astrolabe then visited Fiji, after which Jules Dumont d'Urville executed the first relief maps of the Loyalty Islands (part of French New Caledonia) and explored the coasts of New Guinea. He confirmed the site of La Pérouse's shipwreck in Vanikoro (one of the Santa Cruz Islands, part of the archipelago of the Solomon Islands) and collected numerous remains of his boats. The voyage continued with the mapping of part of the Caroline Islands and the Moluccas. The Astrolabe returned to Marseille on 25 March 1829.

=== Second Voyage under the command of Jules Dumont d'Urville ===
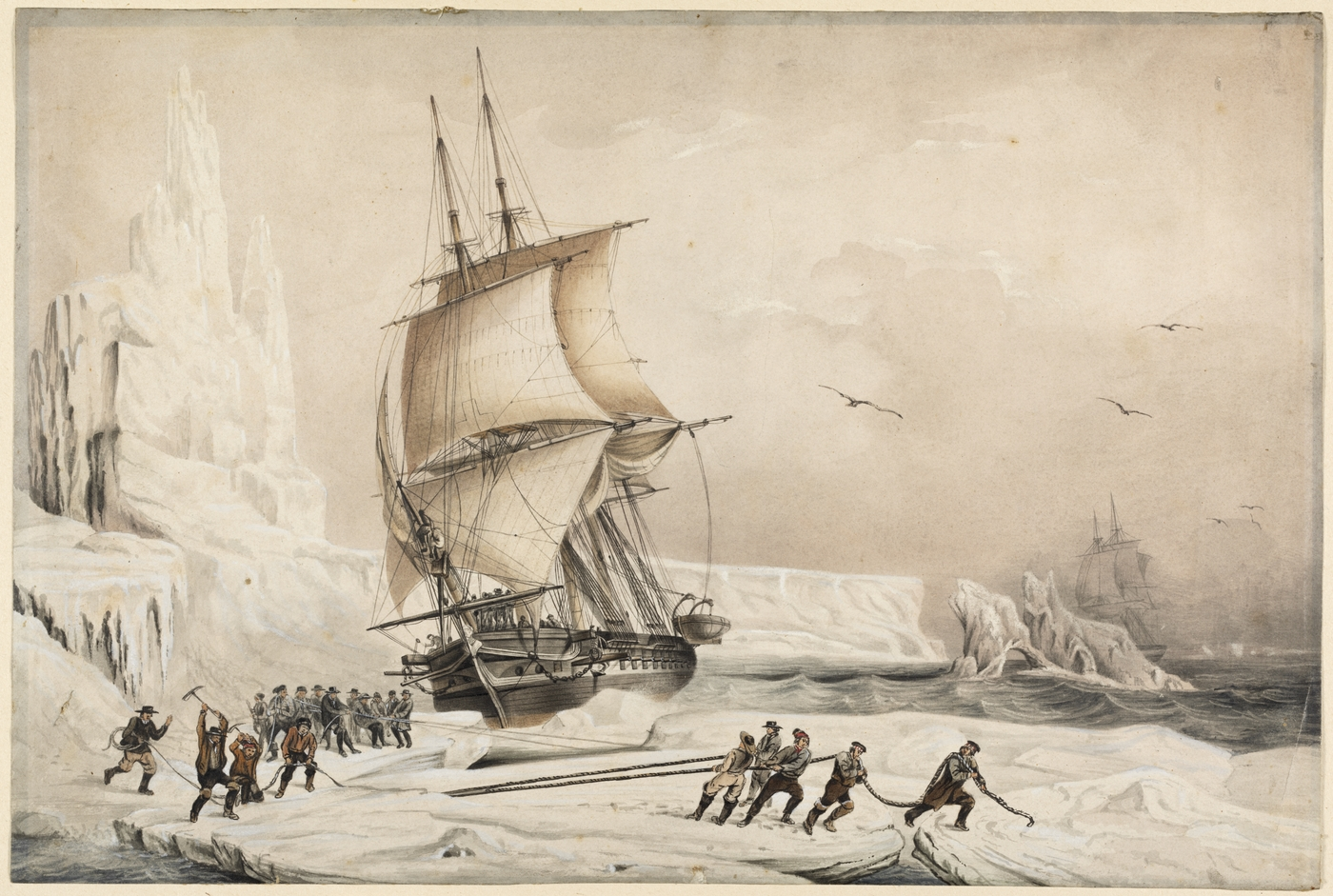
Les Corvettes L'Astrolabe, watercolour by A. Mayer, 1838

Dumont wanted to do further exploration of the Pacific Ocean, however King Louis-Philippe ordered that the second expedition aim for the South Magnetic Pole and to claim it for France; if that was not possible, Dumont's expedition was asked to equal the most southerly latitude of 74°34'S achieved in 1823 by James Weddell. Thus France became part of the international competition for polar exploration, along with the United States and the United Kingdom. Astrolabe and Zélée sailed from Toulon on 7 September 1837.

After reaching the South Orkney Islands, the expedition headed directly to the South Shetland Islands and the Bransfield Strait. In spite of thick fog they located some land only sketched on the maps, which Dumont named Terre de Louis-Philippe (now called Graham Land), the Joinville Island group, and Rosamel Island (now called Andersson Island). As most of the crew had obvious symptoms of scurvy, at the end of February 1838, Dumont accepted that he was not able to continue further south, and he continued to doubt the actual latitude reached by Weddell. He therefore directed the two ships towards Talcahuano, in Chile, where he established a temporary hospital for the crew members affected by scurvy.

The ships then sailed to the Marquesas Islands then to Hobart in Australia on the way south. The expedition followed the coast of Antarctica then carried out experiments to determine the approximate position of the South magnetic pole.

They sighted the schooner USS Porpoise of the United States Exploring Expedition commanded by Charles Wilkes, but due to poor communication, contact was not made.

On 1 February 1840, Dumont decided to turn to the north heading for Hobart, which the two ships reached 17 days later. They were present for the arrival of the two ships of James Ross’s expedition to Antarctica.

On 25 February 1840, the ships sailed towards the Auckland Islands, where they carried out magnetic measurements. The expedition returned via New Zealand, the Torres Strait, Timor, Réunion, Saint Helena and finally Toulon, returning on 6 November 1840.

== Legacy ==
The Astrolabe Subglacial Basin in Antarctica bears her name, as do the Astrolabe Glacier, the Astrolabe Needle, Astrolabe Island, Great Astrolabe Reef (off Kadavu island, Fiji) and Astrolabe Reef (New Zealand).

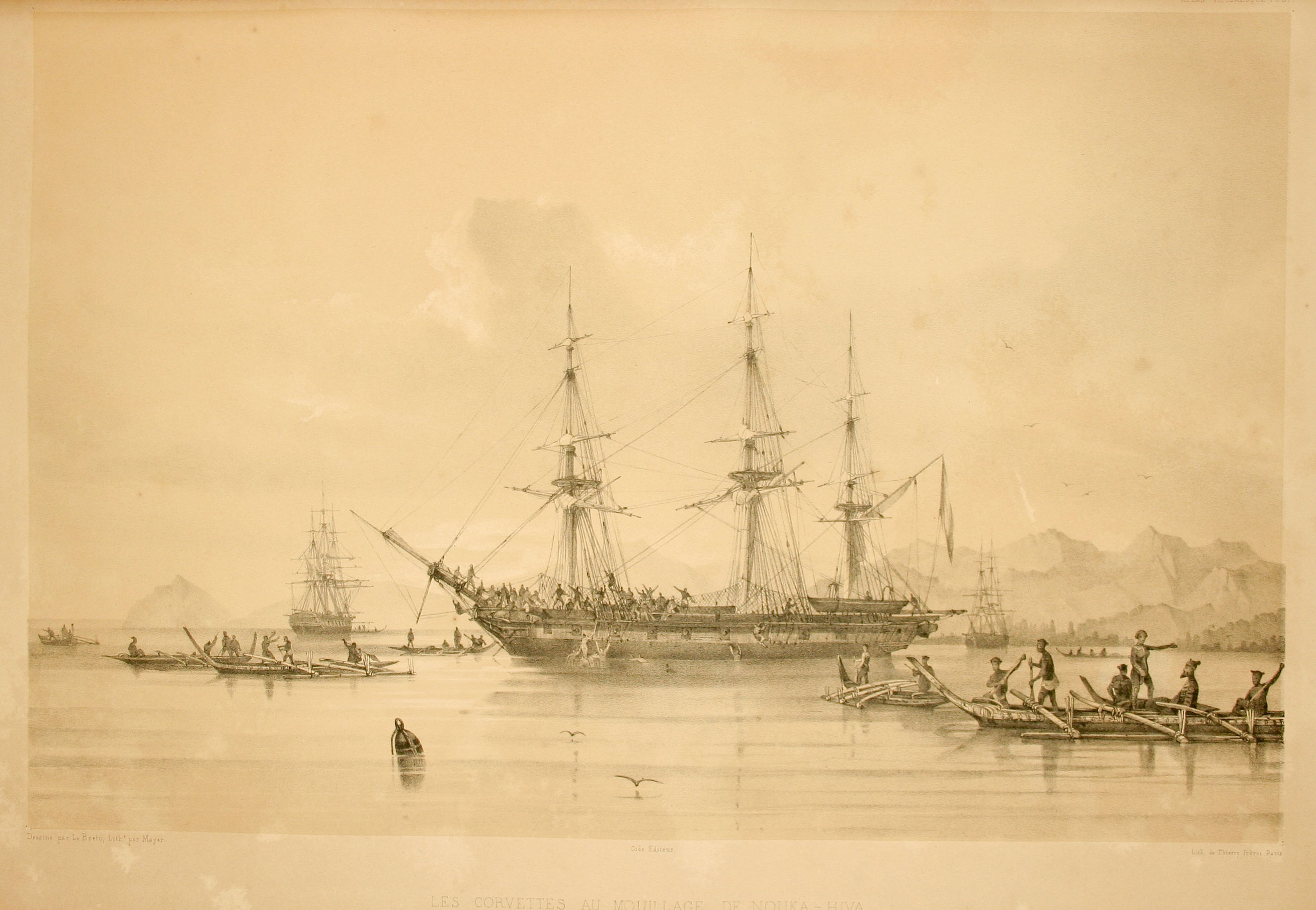
Astrolabe and Zélée an anchor in Anna-Maria Bay (Nuku Hiva). Engraving by Louis Lebreton

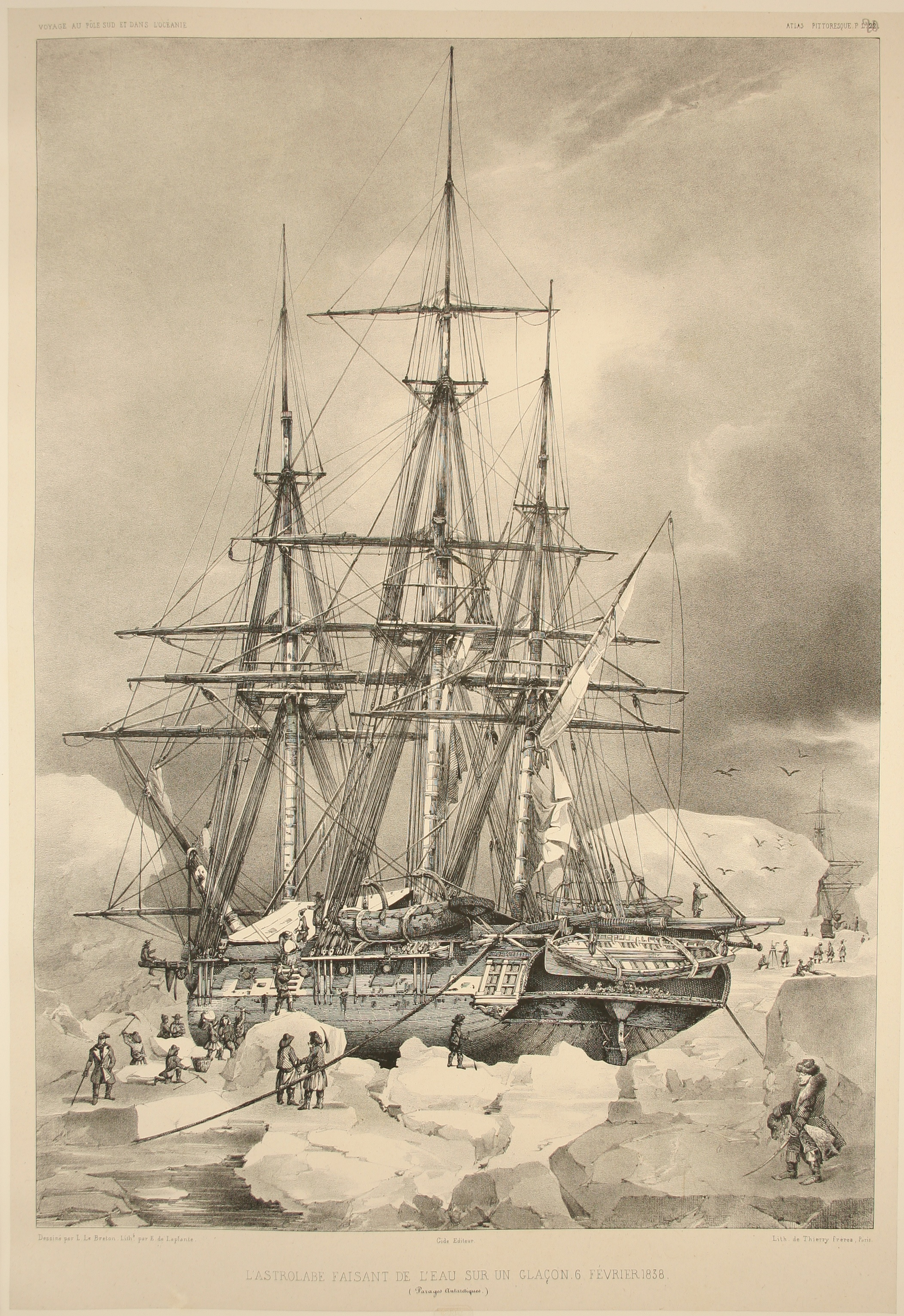
Astrolabe making water on a floe, 6 February 1838.

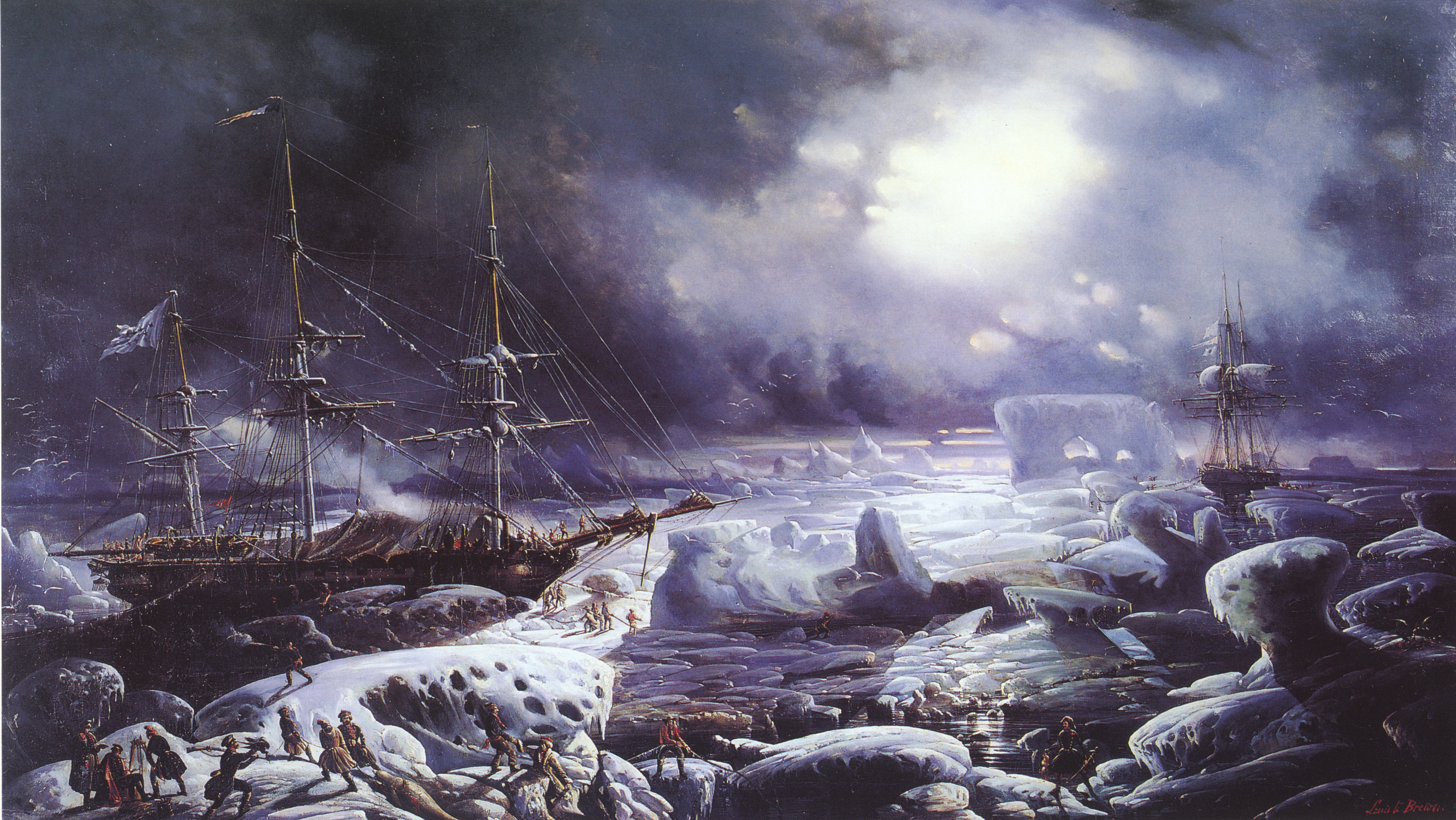
Astrolabe and Zélée stranded in the Austral Ocean. Painting by Louis Lebreton

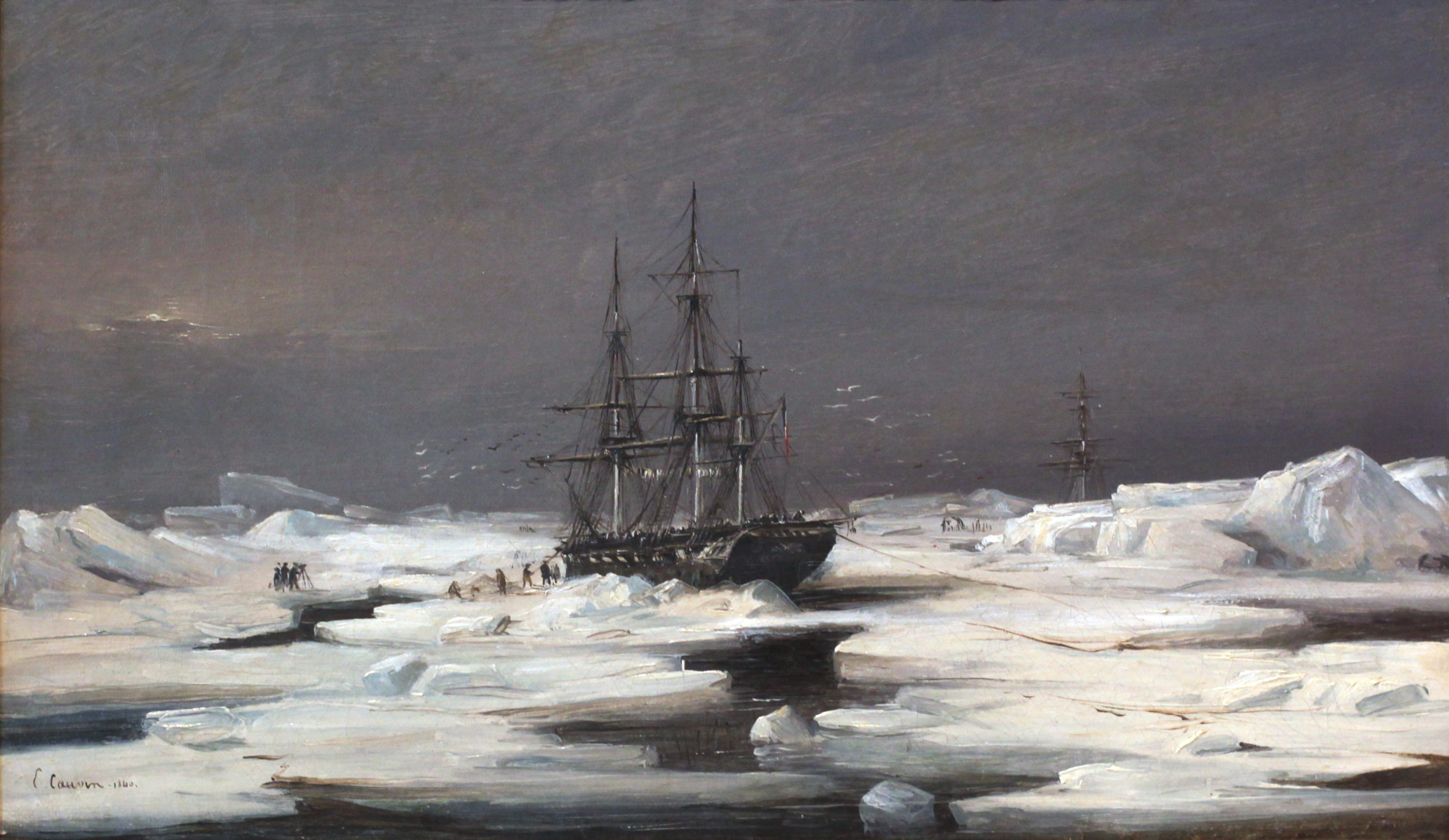
Astrolabe and Zélée caught in ice while discovering Adélie Land, by Louis Cauvin

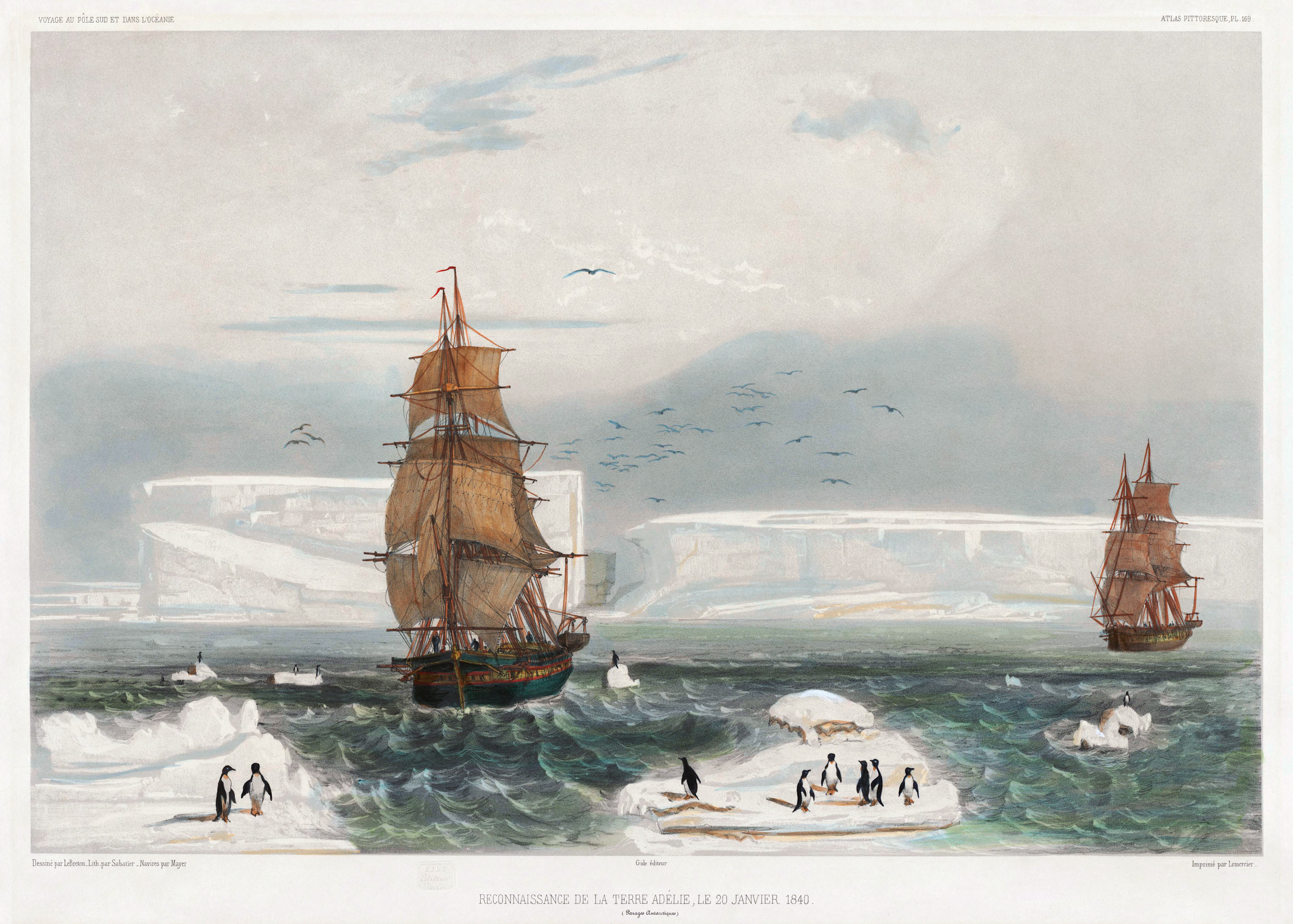
Reconnaissance de la Terre Adelie, le 20 Janvier 1840, lithograph by Léon Sabatier after Louis Le Breton and Auguste Étienne François Mayer
