= Webber Nunatak =

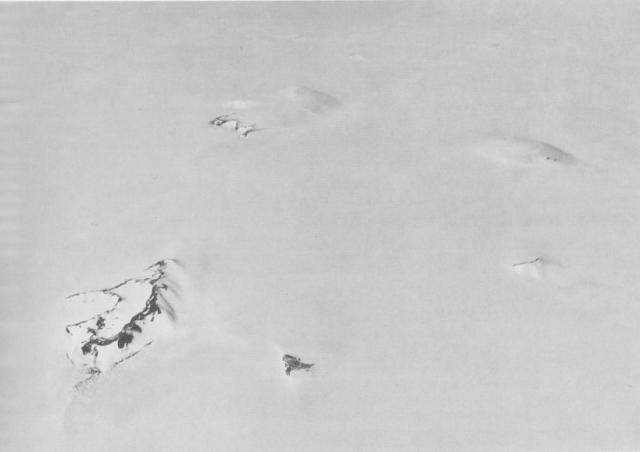
- Aerial view of the southern Hudson Mountains, with Webber Nunatak in the left foreground.

Highest point
- Elevation: 495 m (1,624 ft)
- Coordinates: 74°47′S 99°50′W

Geography
- Location within Antarctica
- Location: Ellsworth Land, Antarctica

Geology
- Mountain type: Volcanic cone

Webber Nunatak is a nunatak (495 m). It stands 6 nautical miles (11 km) west of Mount Manthe in the Hudson Mountains. It was mapped using air photos taken by U.S. Navy Operation Highjump, which took place during 1946 and 1947. It was named in 1967 by the Advisory Committee on Antarctic Names (US-ACAN) for George E. Webber, an electrical engineer at Byrd Station.

Webber Nunatak is one of several volcanic cones in the Hudson Mountains. Satellite imagery suggested an eruption at Webber Nunatak in 1985, although this remains unconfirmed.
