= Hudson Mountains =

Mountain range in Antarctica

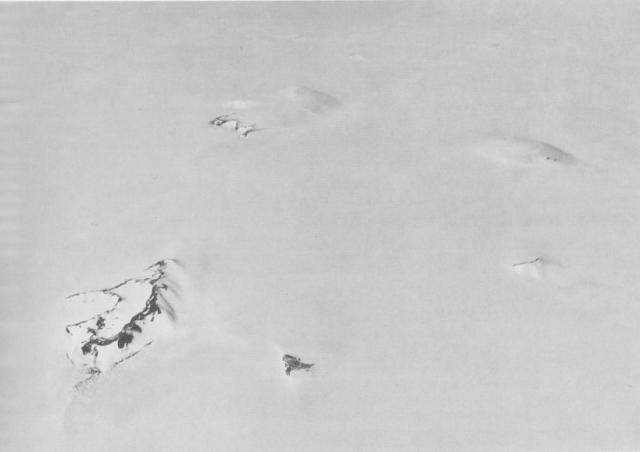
- Aerial view of the southern Hudson Mountains.

Highest point
- Peak: Mount Moses
- Elevation: 750 m (2,460 ft)
- Coordinates: 72°25′S 99°30′W

Geography
- Location within Antarctica
- Location: Ellsworth Land, Antarctica

Geology
- Mountain type: Stratovolcanoes
- Last eruption: 210 BCE

Hudson Mountains

The Hudson Mountains are a mountain range in western Ellsworth Land just east of Pine Island Bay at the Walgreen Coast of the Amundsen Sea. They are of volcanic origin, consisting of low scattered mountains and nunataks that protrude through the West Antarctic Ice Sheet. The Hudson Mountains are bounded on the north by Cosgrove Ice Shelf and on the south by Pine Island Glacier. The mountains were volcanically active during the Miocene and Pliocene, but there is evidence for an eruption about two millennia ago and uncertain indications of activity in the 20th century.

== Geography and geomorphology ==
The Hudson Mountains rise in western Ellsworth Land of West Antarctica and were discovered in 1940 by the United States Antarctic Service Expedition. The mountains lie at some distance from the Amundsen Sea's Walgreen Coast, facing Pine Island Bay. The Cosgrove Ice Shelf lies north of the Hudson Mountains. The 17 mountains are remote and visits are rare. They were visited in 1968, (Note: They were prospected as a potential aircraft landing site in 1991.) 2006, 2007, 2010, 2019-2020 and 2022-2023.

The mountains are a volcanic field formed by parasitic vents and stratovolcanoes covered in snow and ice, forming a cold desert landscape with an area of about 8,400 square kilometres (3,200 sq mi). About 20 mountains emerge above the Antarctic Ice Sheet in the form of nunataks, with the largest rocky outcrops found at Mount Moses and Maish Nunatak. The stratovolcanoes Mount Manthe, Mount Moses, and Teeters Nunatak constitute the bulk of the volcanic field and are heavily eroded. Better preserved are some parasitic cones and volcanic craters which appear to have formed on these three volcanoes. Dean Nunataks has a recognizable volcanic crater, while other nunataks consist of ridges and domes. Meltwater ponds form in locations where sunlight is absorbed by rocks and warms them sufficiently to melt snow, and may form repeatedly in the same places.

Mount Manthe is covered by an ice cap, and many Hudson Mountains are partly or entirely covered in ice. The Lucchitta and Pine Island Glaciers run along the northern and southern margins of the Hudson Mountains, respectively, and receive tributary glaciers from them, while the Larter Glacier traverses the Hudson Mountains between Mount Moses and Mount Manthe. Bergschrunds (gaps between ice and rock) and blue-ice areas occur where the glaciers onlap on the mountains. The glaciers are rapidly thinning owing to global warming.

The highest point of the Hudson Mountains are Mount Manthe and Koehler Nunatak, which reach elevations of 960 metres (3,150 ft) and 874 metres (2,867 ft) above sea level, respectively. Other summits are Mount Moses (749 metres (2,457 ft) above sea level), Teeters Nunatak (617 metres (2,024 ft)) and Mount Manthe (576 metres (1,890 ft)). Other named structures are:

- Inman Nunatak east-southeast, Meyers Nunatak southeast, Shepherd Dome south, 495 metres (1,624 ft) high Webber Nunatak (which has a crater on its northern side) west and Evans Knoll west-southwest of Mount Manthe; there are additional unnamed features southeast of Inman Nunatak and south/southwest of Webber Nunatak.
- Mount Moses is almost due north of Mount Manthe; Siren Rock lies far east of Mount Moses, while 536 metres (1,759 ft) high Slusher Nunatak and 574 metres (1,883 ft) high Velie Nunatak are found north of Mount Moses and 232 metres (761 ft) high Maish Nunatak southwest of Mount Moses. Unnamed features exist between Maish and Moses and east-northeast from Moses.
- West-northwest of Mount Moses is the 212 metres (696 ft) high Tighe Rock, followed to its north by Hodgson Nunatak and then Teeters Nunatak. To the northwest of Teeters is first an unnamed feature, then Mount Nickens. Northeast of Mount Nickens are Pryor Cliff and Kenfield Nunatak.
- There may be about three to eleven volcanoes buried under ice in the Hudson Mountains.

The volcanoes are made up by breccia, palagonite tuff, scoriaceous lava flows and tuffs. At Mount Nickles and Mount Moses there are pillow lavas. Lava fragments are dispersed on the slopes of Mount Moses. Volcanic rock sequences that were emplaced under water and under ice are overlaid by volcanic products that were deposed under the atmosphere, there are deposits of volcanic ash and breccia produced by hydromagmatic activity and tuya-like shapes associated with subglacial growth of the volcanoes. At Mount Moses, erosion has exposed dykes. Glaciers have deposited erratic blocks (Note: Typical erratic blocks on the Hudson Mountains consist of alkali granite, gabbro, granite, granodiorite, syenite and tonalite. None of these rocks occur in the Hudson Mountains and their real source is unclear, but appears to reflect distinct "upstream catchments" for each sector of the Hudson Mountains. One erratics population at World's End Bluff may come from the underlying basement.), glacial till, moraines and moraines on the Hudson Mountains, and left glacial striations on the pillow lavas of Mount Moses. Frost weathering takes place and produced patterned ground at Dean Nunataks. Physical weathering has yielded soils in some areas, while wind erosion has produced ventifacts at Mount Moses. Volcanic glass found in the Pine Island Glacier probably originates in the Hudson Mountains.

== Geology ==
Neighbouring Marie Byrd Land was volcanically active during the Cenozoic, forming a number of volcanoes, some of which are buried under ice, while others emerge above the ice sheet. The Hudson Mountains are part of the Thurston Island or Bellingshausen Volcanic Province, and are its largest and best preserved volcanic field. The volcanism at the mountains may have either been caused by a mantle plume under Marie Byrd Land or by the presence of anomalies (slab windows) in the mantle left over by subduction. Seismic tomography has found evidence of low velocity anomalies under the Hudson Mountains, which may reflect the presence of the Marie Byrd Land mantle plume.

The bedrock around the Hudson Mountains lies below sea level. The basement on which the volcanoes formed is not exposed in the Hudson Mountains, but crops out in the neighbouring Jones Mountains and consists of 175 million years old granites. It forms the so-called Thurston Island tectonic block. Below the Hudson Mountains, the crust is about 21–27 kilometres (13–17 mi) thick. A proposal by Lopatin and Polyakov 1974 is that east and north-trending fractures have controlled the position of the volcanoes.

=== Composition ===
The main volcanic rocks include alkali basalt, basalt, hawaiite and tephrite containing olivine and plagioclase. They define an alkaline suite, some samples trend towards subalkaline. Ultramafic nodules have been reported from some rocks. The magmas erupted by the volcanoes may have originated in a mantle that had been influenced by subduction, and underwent fractionation of olivine as they ascended. Palagonite occurs where weathering took place.

== Life and climate ==
Sparse lichens grow on most of the nunataks, including Usnea species. Mosses have been found growing in gaps between or cracks in boulders. Petrels have been observed. There are no data on the local climate. An automated weather station was installed on Evans Knoll in 2011 and records air temperatures and wind speeds.

== Geologic history ==
The volcanoes were active during the late Miocene and Pliocene. Only from two volcanoes have rocks been dated, Mount Manthe yielding 8.5±1.0 million years and Velie Nunatak yielding 3.7±0.2 million years; older dates in the literature are 20±4 million years and 32.8 million years. There is no evidence of an age progression in any direction.

Ice cover was thicker on the Hudson Mountains during the Last Glacial Maximum, perhaps by about 150 metres (490 ft), and submerged all mountains except maybe for Webber Nunatak. Retreat commenced about 14,000-10,000 years ago; however, glaciers were still thicker than today during the early Holocene and deposited rocks on the Hudson Mountains. Another thinning step began about 8,000 years ago and was very fast, perhaps lasting only a century.

Radar data have found a tephra deposit buried under the ice, which may have originated during an eruption of the Hudson Mountains around 207±240 BCE; the eruption may correspond to an electrical conductivity anomaly in an ice core at Siple Dome and a tephra layer dated to 325 BCE in the Byrd Station ice core. The eruption may have had a volcanic explosivity index of 3-4 and originated in an area east of the main Hudson Mountains. LeMasurier et al. 1990 referenced reports of activity in the Hudson Mountains. These include a report of steaming at one of the nunataks and of satellite data of a potential eruption in 1985 of Webber Nunatak, but the report of this eruption is questionable. There is no evidence of increased heat flow or morphological changes at Webber Nunatak since then, but there is ongoing volcanic seismicity and anomalies in helium isotope ratios from the Pine Island Glacier ice have been attributed to volcanic activity in the Hudson Mountains.

== Named features ==
Hudson Mountains in southwest of map

The southern part of the mountains includes, from west to east, Evans Knoll, Webber Nunatak, Shepherd Dome, Mount Manthe, Inman Nunatak, Meyers Nunatak and Wold Nunatak. The central part includes, from west to east, Tighe Rock, Maish Nunatak, Mount Moses, Velie Nunatak, Slusher Nunatak and Siren Rock. Features to the north, from south to north, include Hodgson Nunatak, Teeters Nunatak, Mount Nickens, Pryor Cliff and Kenfield Nunatak.

=== Evans Knoll ===
74°51′S 100°25′W. A mainly snow-covered knoll on the coast at the north side of the terminus of Pine Island Glacier. It lies 9 nautical miles (17 km; 10 mi) southwest of Webber Nunatak and marks the southwest end of the Hudson Mountains. Mapped from air photos taken by United States Navy OpHjp, 1946-47. Named by US-ACAN for Donald J. Evans who studied very-lowfrequency emissions from the upper atmosphere at Byrd Station,1960-61.

=== Webber Nunatak ===
74°47′S 99°50′W. A nunatak 495 metres (1,624 ft) high standing 6 nautical miles (11 km; 6.9 mi) west of Mount Manthe. Mapped from air photos taken by United States Navy Operation Highjump (OpHjp), 1946–47. Named by US-ACAN for George E. Webber, electrical engineer at Byrd Station, 1967.

=== Shepherd Dome ===
74°52′S 99°33′W. A low dome-shaped mountain at the north side of Pine Island Glacier, standing 4 nautical miles (7.4 km; 4.6 mi) southwest of Mount Manthe. Mapped from air photos made by United States Navy OpHjp, 1946-47. Named by US-ACAN for Donald C. Shepherd, ionospheric physicist at Byrd Station, 1967.

=== Mount Manthe ===
74°47′S 99°21′W. A mountain 575 metres (1,886 ft) high standing 5 nautical miles (9.3 km; 5.8 mi) north-northeast of Shepherd Dome, in the south part of the Hudson Mountains. Mapped from air photos taken by United States Navy OpHjp, 1946-47. Named by US-ACAN for Lawrene L. Manthe, meteorologist at Byrd Station, 1967.

=== Inman Nunatak ===
74°49′S 98°54′W. A nunatak standing 6 nautical miles (11 km; 6.9 mi) east of Mount Manthe in the southeast part of the Hudson Mountains. Mapped by USGS from surveys and United States Navy air photos, 1960-66. Named by US-ACAN for Martin M. Inman, auroral scientist at Byrd Station, 1960–61 and 1961-62 seasons.

=== Meyers Nunatak ===
74°54′S 98°46′W. A nunatak located 10 nautical miles (19 km; 12 mi) east-southeast of Mount Manthe, at the southeast end of the Hudson Mountains. Mapped by USGS from surveys and United States Navy air photos, 1960-66. Named by US-ACAN for Herbert Meyers, USARP geomagnetist at Byrd Station, 1960-61.

=== Wold Nunatak ===
74°47′S 98°38′W. A nunatak standing 10 nautical miles (19 km; 12 mi) east of Mount Manthe in the southeast part of the Hudson Mountains. Mapped by USGS from surveys and United States Navy air photos, 1960-66. Named by US-ACAN for Richard J. Wold, USARP geologist at Byrd Station, 1960-61 season.

=== Koehler Nunatak ===
74°52′S 98°08′W. Isolated nunatak about 20 nautical miles (37 km; 23 mi) east-southeast of Mount Manthe, at the southeast margin of the Hudson Mountains. Mapped by USGS from ground surveys and United States Navy air photos, 1960-66. Named by US-ACAN for Walter Koehler, United States Army Aviation Detachment, helicopter pilot for the Ellsworth Land Survey, 1968-69.

=== Tighe Rock ===
74°26′S 100°04′W. A rock outcropping along the coastal slope at the west margin of the Hudson Mountains, located 15 nautical miles (28 km; 17 mi) northwest of Mount Moses. Mapped by USGS from surveys and United States Navy air photos, 1960-66. Named by US-ACAN for Robert F. Tighe, electrical engineer at Byrd Station, 1964-65.

=== Maish Nunatak ===
74°36′S 99°28′W. A nunatak located 5 nautical miles (9.3 km; 5.8 mi) west-southwest of Mount Moses, in the central part of the Hudson Mountains. Mapped by USGS from surveys and United States Navy air photos, 1960-66. Named by US-ACAN for F. Michael Maish, ionospheric physicist at Byrd Station in 1967, who served as United States exchange scientist at Vostok Station in 1969.

=== Mount Moses ===
74°33′S 99°11′W. The highest 750 metres (2,460 ft) high and most prominent of the Hudson Mountains, located near the center of the group, about 14 nautical miles (26 km; 16 mi) north-northeast of Mount Manthe. Mapped from air photos taken by United States Navy OpHjp, 1946–47. Named by US-ACAN for Robert L. Moses, geomagnetist-seismologist at Byrd Station, 1967.

=== Dean Nunataks ===
74°31′S 98°48′W. Two nunataks lying about 6 nautical miles (11 km; 6.9 mi) east-northeast of Mount Moses. Mapped by USGS from ground surveys and United States Navy air photos, 1960-66. Named by US-ACAN for William S. Dean of Pleasanton, Texas, who served as ham radio contact in the United States for the Ellsworth Land Survey party of 1968-69, and for other USARP field parties over a three year period.

=== Velie Nunatak ===
74°23′S 99°10′W. A nunatak located 9 nautical miles (17 km; 10 mi) north of Mount Moses. Mapped by USGS from surveys and United States Navy air photos, 1960-66. Named by US-AC AN for Edward C. Velie, meteorologist at Byrd Station, 1967.

=== Slusher Nunatak ===
74°27′S 99°06′W. A nunatak lying 5 nautical miles (9.3 km; 5.8 mi) north of Mount Moses. Mapped from air photos taken by United States Navy OpHjp, 1946-47. Named by US-ACAN for Harold E. Slusher, meteorologist at Byrd Station, 1967.

=== Siren Rock ===
74°33′S 98°24′W. A fairly isolated rock lying 12 nautical miles (22 km; 14 mi) east of-Mount Moses, in the east part of the Hudson Mountains. Mapped by USGS from surveys and United States Navy air photos, 1960-66. Named by US-ACAN for Jan C. Siren, radio scientist at Byrd Station, 1967.

=== Hodgson Nunatak ===
74°17′S 100°04′W. A nunatak which lies 5 nautical miles (9.3 km; 5.8 mi) south of Teeters Nunatak and 20 nautical miles (37 km; 23 mi) northwest of Mount Moses. Mapped by USGS from surveys and United States Navy air photos, 1960-66. Named by US-ACAN for Ronald A. Hodgson, United States Navy, builder with the Byrd Station party, 1966.

=== Teeters Nunata ===
74°12′S 100°01′W. A nunatak 615 metres (2,018 ft) high standing 5 nautical miles (9.3 km; 5.8 mi) north of Hodgson Nunatak. Mapped by USGS from surveys and United States Navy air photos, 1960-66. Named by US-ACAN for Robert E. Teeters, United States Navy, storekeeper at Byrd Station, 1966.

=== Rebholz Nunatak ===
74°05′S 100°13′W. Isolated nunatak just north of the Hudson Mountains, located 8 nautical miles (15 km; 9.2 mi) north-northwest of Teeters Nunatak. Mapped by USGS from ground surveys and United States Navy air photos, 1960-66. Named by US-ACAN for Major Edward Rebholz, operations officer of the United States Army Aviation Detachment which supported the Ellsworth Land Survey, 1968-69.

=== Mount Nickens ===
73°56′S 100°20′W. A snow-covered mesa-type mountain with a steep northern rock face, marking the northwest extremity of the Hudson Mountains. It stands just east of the base of Canisteo Peninsula and overlooks Cosgrove Ice Shelf. Mapped from air photos taken by United States Navy OpHjp, 1946-47. Named by US-ACAN for Herbert P. Nickens, map compilation specialist who contributed significantly to the construction of USGS sketch maps of Antarctica.

=== Pryor Cliff ===
73°53′S 100°00′W. A distinctive rock cliff which faces northward toward Cosgrove Ice Shelf, standing 5 nautical miles (9.3 km; 5.8 mi) northeast of Mount Nickens at the north end of the Hudson Mountains. Mapped by USGS from surveys and United States Navy air photos, 1960-66. Named by US-ACAN for Douglas A. Pryor, map compilation specialist who contributed significantly to construction of USGS sketch maps of Antarctica.

=== Kenfield Nunatak ===
73°46′S 99°03′W. An isolated nunatak which lies about 8 nautical miles (15 km; 9.2 mi) southeast of the head of Cosgrove Ice Shelf and 17 nautical miles (31 km; 20 mi) east-northeast of Pryor Cliff, at the extreme north end of the Hudson Mountains. Mapped by USGS from ground surveys and United States Navy air photos, 1960-66. Named by US-ACAN for Richard E. Kenfield, USGS topographic engineer working from Byrd Station in the 1963-64 season.

== Sources ==
- Abakumov, E. V. (1 March 2010). "Particle-size distribution in soils of West Antarctica". Eurasian Soil Science. 43 (3): 297–304. Bibcode:2010EurSS..43..297A. doi:10.1134/S1064229310030075. ISSN 1556-195X. S2CID 59140326.
- U. S. Board on Geographic Names; Water Resources Division, U. S. Geological Survey; Defense Mapping Agency; National Science Foundation (1995), Alberts, Fred G. (ed.), "Geographic Names of the Antarctic" (PDF), USGS Report (2 ed.), United States Board on Geographic Names: 3, Bibcode:1995usgs.rept....3U This article incorporates public domain material from websites or documents of the United States Board on Geographic Names.
- Bockheim, James G., ed. (2015). The Soils of Antarctica. World Soils Book Series. Cham: Springer International Publishing. doi:10.1007/978-3-319-05497-1. ISBN 978-3-319-05496-4. S2CID 128446762.
- Corr, Hugh F. J.; Vaughan, David G. (February 2008). "A recent volcanic eruption beneath the West Antarctic ice sheet". Nature Geoscience. 1 (2): 122–125. Bibcode:2008NatGe...1..122C. doi:10.1038/ngeo106. ISSN 1752-0908.
- Djoumna, G.; Holland, D. M. (16 July 2021). "Atmospheric Rivers, Warm Air Intrusions, and Surface Radiation Balance in the Amundsen Sea Embayment". Journal of Geophysical Research: Atmospheres. 126 (13) e2020JD034119. Bibcode:2021JGRD..12634119D. doi:10.1029/2020JD034119. ISSN 2169-897X. S2CID 236239992.
- Gilbert, Gareth E.; Early, Tommy J.; King, Harold T. (1969). "Biological Survey of Ellsworth Land". Antarctic Journal of the United States. 4 (4) – via Google Books.
- Gohl, Karsten, ed. (2007). The Expedition ANT-XXIII/4 of the Research Vessel Polarstern in 2006 (PDF) (Report). Alfred Wegener Institute.
- Herbert, Lisa C.; Lepp, Allison P.; Garcia, Santiago Munevar; Browning, Arianne; Miller, Lauren E.; Wellner, Julia; Severmann, Silke; Hillenbrand, Claus-Dieter; Johnson, Joanne S.; Sherrell, Robert M. (20 June 2023). "Volcanogenic fluxes of iron from the seafloor in the Amundsen Sea, West Antarctica". Marine Chemistry. 253 104250. Bibcode:2023MarCh.25304250H. doi:10.1016/j.marchem.2023.104250. ISSN 0304-4203. S2CID 259581306.
- Hole, M. J.; Storey, B. C.; LeMasurier, W. E. (March 1994). "Tectonic setting and geochemistry of Miocene alkalic basalts from the Jones Mountains, West Antarctica". Antarctic Science. 6 (1): 85–92. Bibcode:1994AntSc...6...85H. doi:10.1017/S0954102094000118. ISSN 0954-1020. S2CID 140145846.
- Ivins, Erik R.; James, Thomas S.; Wahr, John; O. Schrama, Ernst J.; Landerer, Felix W.; Simon, Karen M. (June 2013). "Antarctic contribution to sea level rise observed by GRACE with improved GIA correction: ANTARCTIC GIA AND RECENT ICE MASS LOSS". Journal of Geophysical Research: Solid Earth. 118 (6): 3126–3141. doi:10.1002/jgrb.50208. S2CID 15802563.
- Johnson, J. S.; Bentley, M. J.; Smith, J. A.; Finkel, R. C.; Rood, D. H.; Gohl, K.; Balco, G.; Larter, R. D.; Schaefer, J. M. (28 February 2014). "Rapid Thinning of Pine Island Glacier in the Early Holocene". Science. 343 (6174): 999–1001. Bibcode:2014Sci...343..999J. doi:10.1126/science.1247385. ISSN 0036-8075. PMID 24557837. S2CID 38682696.
- Johnson, Joanne S.; Woodward, John; Nesbitt, Ian; Winter, Kate; Campbell, Seth; Nichols, Keir A.; Venturelli, Ryan A.; Braddock, Scott; Goehring, Brent M.; Hall, Brenda; Rood, Dylan H.; Balco, Greg (24 January 2025). "Assessing the suitability of sites near Pine Island Glacier for subglacial bedrock drilling aimed at detecting Holocene retreat–readvance". The Cryosphere. 19 (1): 303–324. Bibcode:2025TCry...19..303J. doi:10.5194/tc-19-303-2025. ISSN 1994-0416.
- Johnson, Joanne S.; Nichols, Keir A.; Riley, Teal R.; Venturelli, Ryan A.; Hodgson, Dominic A.; Balco, Greg; Hall, Brenda; Smith, James A.; Woodward, John (February 2025). "Glacial geology of the Hudson Mountains, Amundsen Sea sector, West Antarctica". Quaternary Science Reviews. 350 109027. Bibcode:2025QSRv..35009027J. doi:10.1016/j.quascirev.2024.109027.
- Jordan, Tom A.; Johnson, Joanne S.; Riley, Teal R.; Conrad, Ethan; Carter, Andrew (22 October 2025). "Subglacial geology and palaeo flow of Pine Island Glacier from combining glacial erratics with geophysics". Communications Earth & Environment. 6 (1) 826. Bibcode:2025ComEE...6..826J. doi:10.1038/s43247-025-02783-3.
- Larter, Robert D.; Anderson, John B.; Graham, Alastair G. C.; Gohl, Karsten; Hillenbrand, Claus-Dieter; Jakobsson, Martin; Johnson, Joanne S.; Kuhn, Gerhard; Nitsche, Frank O.; Smith, James A.; Witus, Alexandra E.; Bentley, Michael J.; Dowdeswell, Julian A.; Ehrmann, Werner; Klages, Johann P.; Lindow, Julia; Cofaigh, Colm Ó; Spiegel, Cornelia (15 September 2014). "Reconstruction of changes in the Amundsen Sea and Bellingshausen Sea sector of the West Antarctic Ice Sheet since the Last Glacial Maximum". Quaternary Science Reviews. 100: 55–86. Bibcode:2014QSRv..100...55L. doi:10.1016/j.quascirev.2013.10.016. hdl:1911/88244. ISSN 0277-3791. S2CID 55225396.
- Lenaerts, Jan T. M.; Ligtenberg, Stefan R. M.; Medley, Brooke; Berg, Willem Jan Van de; Konrad, Hannes; Nicolas, Julien P.; Wessem, J. Melchior Van; Trusel, Luke D.; Mulvaney, Robert; Tuckwell, Rebecca J.; Hogg, Anna E.; Thomas, Elizabeth R. (July 2018). "Climate and surface mass balance of coastal West Antarctica resolved by regional climate modelling". Annals of Glaciology. 59 (76pt1): 29–41. Bibcode:2018AnGla..59...29L. doi:10.1017/aog.2017.42. ISSN 0260-3055. S2CID 41268146.
- LeMasurier, W.E.; Thomson, J.W.; Baker, P.E.; Kyle, P.R.; Rowley, P.D.; Smellie, J.L.; Verwoerd, W.J., eds. (1990). Volcanoes of the Antarctic Plate and Southern Oceans. Antarctic Research Series. Vol. 48. Washington, D. C.: American Geophysical Union. doi:10.1029/ar048. ISBN 978-0-87590-172-5.
- Loose, Brice; Naveira Garabato, Alberto C.; Schlosser, Peter; Jenkins, William J.; Vaughan, David; Heywood, Karen J. (22 June 2018). "Evidence of an active volcanic heat source beneath the Pine Island Glacier". Nature Communications. 9 (1): 2431. Bibcode:2018NatCo...9.2431L. doi:10.1038/s41467-018-04421-3. ISSN 2041-1723. PMC 6014989. PMID 29934507.
- Lucas, Erica M.; Soto, David; Nyblade, Andrew A.; Lloyd, Andrew J.; Aster, Richard C.; Wiens, Douglas A.; O'Donnell, John Paul; Stuart, Graham W.; Wilson, Terry J.; Dalziel, Ian W.; Winberry, J. Paul; Huerta, Audrey D. (September 2020). "P- and S-wave velocity structure of central West Antarctica: Implications for the tectonic evolution of the West Antarctic Rift System". Earth and Planetary Science Letters. 546 116437. Bibcode:2020E&PSL.54616437L. doi:10.1016/j.epsl.2020.116437. S2CID 224847286.
- Nichols, Keir A.; Rood, Dylan H.; Venturelli, Ryan A.; Balco, Greg; Adams, Jonathan R.; Guillaume, Louise; Campbell, Seth; Goehring, Brent M.; Hall, Brenda L.; Wilcken, Klaus; Woodward, John; Johnson, Joanne S. (17 August 2023). "Offshore-onshore record of Last Glacial Maximum−to−present grounding line retreat at Pine Island Glacier, Antarctica". Geology. 51 (11): 1033–1037. Bibcode:2023Geo....51.1033N. doi:10.1130/G51326.1. hdl:10044/1/105596. ISSN 0091-7613. S2CID 260986704.
- O'Donnell, J. P.; Brisbourne, A. M.; Stuart, G. W.; Dunham, C. K.; Yang, Y.; Nield, G. A.; Whitehouse, P. L.; Nyblade, A. A.; Wiens, D. A.; Anandakrishnan, S.; Aster, R. C.; Huerta, A. D.; Lloyd, A. J.; Wilson, T.; Winberry, J. P. (November 2019). "Mapping Crustal Shear Wave Velocity Structure and Radial Anisotropy Beneath West Antarctica Using Seismic Ambient Noise". Geochemistry, Geophysics, Geosystems. 20 (11): 5014–5037. Bibcode:2019GGG....20.5014O. doi:10.1029/2019GC008459. ISSN 1525-2027. S2CID 210629907.
- Panter, K. S.; Wilch, T. I.; Smellie, J. L.; Kyle, P. R.; McIntosh, W. C. (January 2021). "Chapter 5.4b Marie Byrd Land and Ellsworth Land: petrology". Geological Society, London, Memoirs. 55 (1): 577–614. Bibcode:2021GSLMm..55..577P. doi:10.1144/M55-2019-50. ISSN 0435-4052. S2CID 233620473.
- Patrick, Matthew R.; Smellie, John L. (August 2013). "Synthesis A spaceborne inventory of volcanic activity in Antarctica and southern oceans, 2000–10". Antarctic Science. 25 (4): 475–500. Bibcode:2013AntSc..25..475P. doi:10.1017/S0954102013000436. S2CID 128905897.
- Quartini, Enrica; Blankenship, Donald D.; Young, Duncan A. (January 2021). "Chapter 7.5 Active subglacial volcanism in West Antarctica". Geological Society, London, Memoirs. 55 (1): 785–803. Bibcode:2021GSLMm..55..785Q. doi:10.1144/M55-2019-3. ISSN 0435-4052. S2CID 233612329 – via NSF Public Access.
- Rose, G.; Fischer, K. M.; Peña Castro, A. F. F.; Schmandt, B. (December 2023). Evidence for Volcanic Seismicity beneath the Hudson Mountains in West Antarctica. AGU Fall Meeting. Vol. 2023. V11E-01.
- Rutford, Robert H.; Craddock, Campbell; Bastien, Thomas W. (1 July 1968). "Late tertiary glaciation and sea-level changes in Antarctica". Palaeogeography, Palaeoclimatology, Palaeoecology. 5 (1): 15–39. Bibcode:1968PPP.....5...15R. doi:10.1016/0031-0182(68)90058-8. ISSN 0031-0182.
- Smellie, John L.; Edwards, Benjamin R. (2016). Glaciovolcanism on Earth and Mars. Cambridge University Press.
- Swithinbank, Charles (1991). Potential airfield sites in Antarctica for wheeled aircraft. Vol. 91. US Government Printing Office – via Google Books.
- Thurston Island to Jones Mountains (PDF), USGS: United States Geological Survey, 1967
- WADE, F. ALTON; La PRADE, KERBY E. (1969). "Geology of the King Peninsula, Canister Peninsula, and Hudson Mountains Areas, Ellsworth Land, Antarctica". Antarctic Journal of the United States. 4 (4) – via Google Books.
- Wilch, T. I.; McIntosh, W. C.; Panter, K. S. (January 2021). "Chapter 5.4a Marie Byrd Land and Ellsworth Land: volcanology". Geological Society, London, Memoirs. 55 (1): 515–576. Bibcode:2021GSLMm..55..515W. doi:10.1144/M55-2019-39. ISSN 0435-4052. S2CID 233632723.

This article incorporates public domain material from websites or documents of the United States Geological Survey.
