= Maish House =

Historic house in Iowa, United States

- U.S. National Register of Historic Places
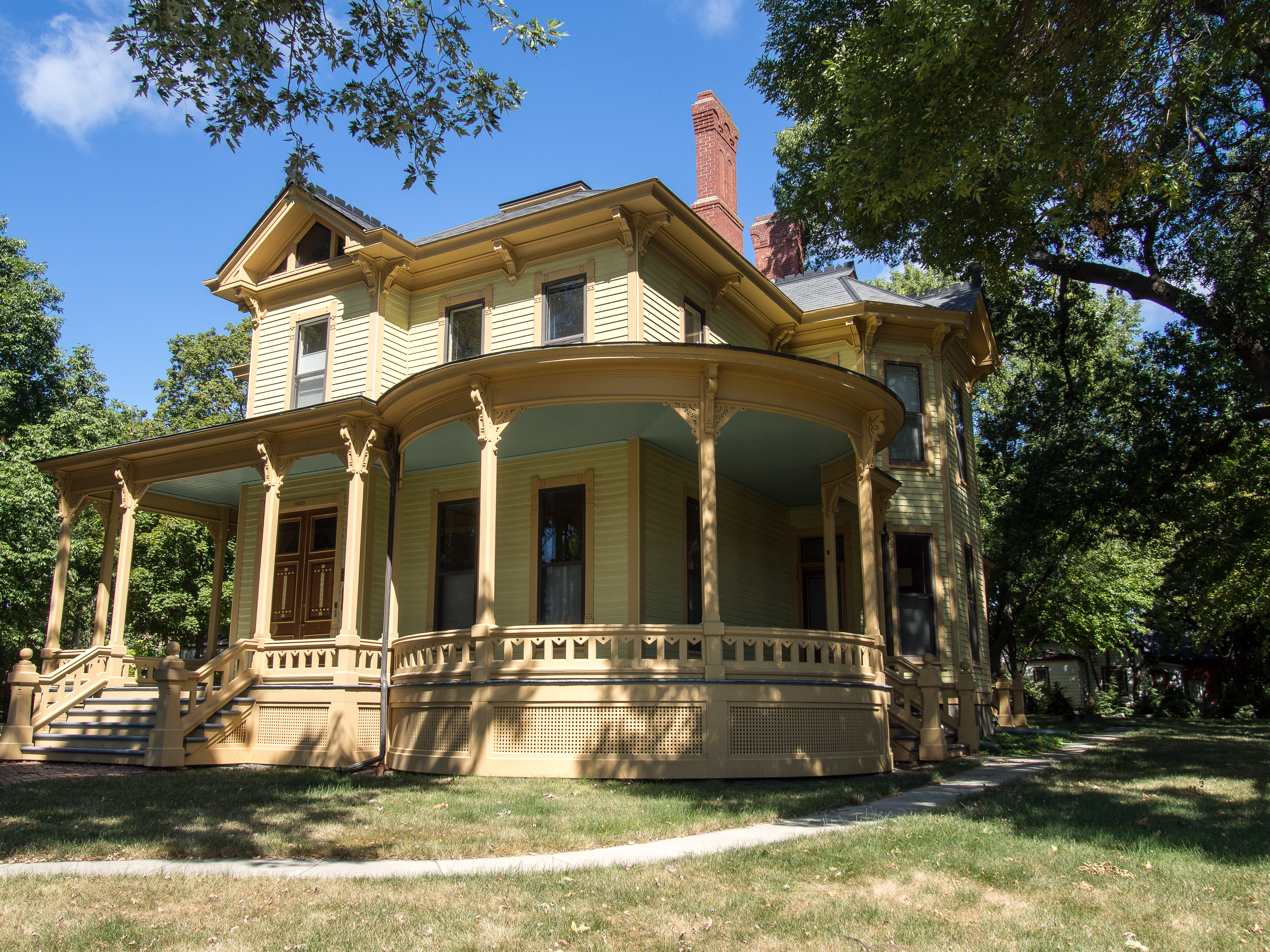

- Location within Iowa Location within the United States
- Location: 1623 Center St. Des Moines, Iowa
- Coordinates: 41°35′31.1″N 93°38′23.7″W
- Area: less than one acre
- Built: 1882
- Architectural style: Italianate
- NRHP reference No.: 77000548
- Added to NRHP: April 11, 1977

The Maish House is a historic building located in Des Moines, Iowa, United States. George H. Maish was involved with a coal company and bank in his native Pennsylvania before he and his family relocated to Des Moines in 1869. While here he was a partner with his brother-in-law in a drug firm, in banking, and insurance. He had this house built in 1882. It calls attention to Maish as a prosperous 19th-century businessman, and its high-quality Victorian craftsmanship. The two-story frame structure was built in the Italianate style with Eastlake details, especially on the inside. It includes a burglar alarm/servants' call box which is still operative. The exterior features a wrap around porch, a hip roof, metal cresting on the ridge, various gables that are filled in with glass, bracketed eaves, and three corbelled chimneys. The house was listed on the National Register of Historic Places in 1977.
