= Astrolabe Subglacial Basin =

Subglacial basin of Antarctica

Coordinates: 70°S 136°E

Astrolabe Subglacial Basin is a subglacial basin to the south of the Adélie Coast and east of Porpoise Subglacial Highlands, trending north–south and containing the thickest ice — about 4,700 metres (15,400 ft) — measured in Antarctica. The basin was delineated by the SPRI-NSF-TUD airborne radio echo sounding program, 1967–79, and named after the Astrolabe, the flagship of the French Antarctic Expedition, 1837–40, under Captain Jules Dumont d'Urville.
