= Ice Sheet Mass Balance Inter-comparison Exercise =

The Ice Sheet Mass Balance Inter-comparison Exercise (IMBIE) is an international scientific collaboration attempting to improve estimates of the Antarctic and Greenland ice sheet contribution to sea level rise and to publish data and analyses concerning these subjects. IMBIE was founded in 2011 and is a collaboration between the European Space Agency (ESA) and the National Aeronautics and Space Administration (NASA) of the United States, and contributes to assessment reports of the Intergovernmental Panel on Climate Change (IPCC). IMBIE has led to improved confidence in the measurement of ice sheet mass balance and the associated global sea-level contribution. The improvements were achieved through combination of ice sheet imbalance estimates developed from the independent satellite techniques of altimetry, gravimetry and the input-output method. Going forwards, IMBIE provides a framework for assessing ice sheet mass balance, and has an explicit aim to widen participation to enable the entire scientific community to become involved.

== Results ==
=== IMBIE 2012 ===
The IMBIE project produced its first estimate of ice sheet mass balance in 2012 as a direct contribution to the fifth assessment report of the Intergovernmental Panel on Climate Change. IMBIE 2012 included an international team of 47 scientists based in 26 separate institutions, and was co-led by Andrew Shepherd and Erik Ivins. Over the course of the 19-year survey (1992 – 2011), the average rates of mass balance of the Antarctic and Greenland ice sheets were estimated to be -71 ± 53 and -152 ± 49 Gt yr^{−1}, respectively, and the total ice loss equated to a global rise in sea level of 11.1 ± 3.8 mm. Examining the ice sheet regions individually showed that the Greenland, West Antarctic and Antarctic Peninsula ice sheets all lost mass between 1992 and 2011, whilst the East Antarctic ice sheet had undergone a slight snowfall-driven growth. The Greenland ice sheet the largest mass and accounted for about two-thirds of the combined ice sheet loss over the study period. In Antarctica, the largest mass losses have occurred in the West Antarctic Ice Sheet. However, despite occupying just 4% of the total ice sheet area, the Antarctic Peninsula has accounted for around 25% of the Antarctic mass losses.

=== IMBIE 2018 (Antarctica) ===
In 2018 the IMBIE project produced an updated assessment of ice loss in Antarctica, combining 24 satellite surveys produced by 84 scientists from 44 international organisations. In this assessment, the IMBIE project reported that between 1992 and 2017 Antarctica lost 2720 ± 1390 billion tonnes of ice, equivalent to an increase in global sea levels by 7.6 ± 3.9 mm. Prior to 2012, Antarctica lost ice at a steady rate of 76 billion tonnes per year – a 0.2 mm per year contribution to sea level rise. However, since then there has been a sharp, threefold increase - between 2012 and 2017 Antarctica lost 219 billion tonnes of ice per year, a 0.6 mm per year sea level contribution. Almost all of the ice lost from Antarctica has been triggered by warming oceans melting their outlet glaciers, which causes them to speed up. Comparison to sea level rise projections provided in the fifth assessment report of the Intergovernmental Panel on Climate Change revealed that Antarctic ice losses are tracking the worst-case climate warming scenarios, which could result in an extra 10 cm of sea level rise by 2100.

=== IMBIE 2020 (Greenland) ===
In 2020 the IMBIE project produced an updated assessment of ice loss in Greenland, combining 26 satellite surveys produced by 96 scientists from 50 international organisations. The findings show that Greenland has lost 3902 ± 342 billion tonnes of ice since 1992 – enough to push global sea levels up by 10.8 ± 0.9 millimetres. The rate of ice loss has risen from 34 billion tonnes per year in the 1990s to 234 billion tonnes per year in the last decade – a seven-fold increase within three decades. The team also used regional climate models to show that half of the ice losses were due to surface melting as air temperatures have risen. The other half has been due to increased glacier flow, triggered by rising ocean temperatures. Ice losses peaked at 345 billion tonnes per year in 2011 – ten times the rate of the 1990s - during a period of intense surface melting. Although the rate of ice loss dropped to an average 206 billion tonnes per year since then, this remains seven times higher than ice losses in the 1990s and does not include all of 2019, which could set a new high due to widespread summer melting. Comparison to sea level rise projections provided in the fifth assessment report of the Intergovernmental Panel on Climate Change revealed that Greenland ice losses are also tracking the worst-case climate warming scenarios, which could result in an extra 7 cm of sea level rise by 2100.

Combining both ice sheets, the rate of ice loss has risen by a factor six in just three decades, up from 81 billion tonnes per year in the 1990s to 475 billion tonnes per year in the 2010s. This means that the polar ice sheets are now responsible for a third of all sea level rise.

== See also ==
- Marine ice sheet instability
