= Belgica Subglacial Highlands =

Geographic area in Antarctica

Coordinates: 76°30′S 129°0′E

The Belgica Subglacial Highlands are a group of subglacial highlands to the southeast of Dome Charlie in Wilkes Land, Antarctica, running north–south and separating Peacock Subglacial Trench and Adventure Subglacial Trench from Wilkes Subglacial Basin. The feature was delineated by the SPRI–NSF–TUD airborne radio echo sounding program, 1967–79, and named after the Belgica, the ship of the Belgian Antarctic Expedition, 1897–99, under Gerlache.
