= Climate change in Antarctica =

Impacts of climate change on Antarctica

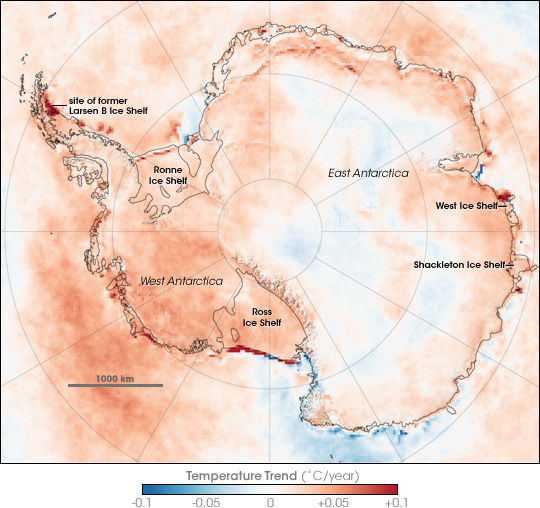
Antarctic surface ice layer temperature trends between 1981 and 2007, based on thermal infrared observations made by a series of NOAA satellite sensors.

Despite its isolation, Antarctica has experienced warming and ice loss in recent decades, driven by greenhouse gas emissions. West Antarctica warmed by over 0.1 °C per decade from the 1950s to the 2000s, and the exposed Antarctic Peninsula has warmed by 3 °C (5.4 °F) since the mid-20th century. The colder, stabler East Antarctica did not show any warming until the 2000s. Around Antarctica, the Southern Ocean has absorbed more oceanic heat than any other ocean, and has seen strong warming at depths below 2,000 m (6,600 ft). Around the West Antarctic, the ocean has warmed by 1 °C (1.8 °F) since 1955.

The warming of the Southern Ocean around Antarctica has caused the weakening or collapse of ice shelves, which float just offshore of glaciers and stabilize them. Many coastal glaciers have been losing mass and retreating, causing net ice loss across Antarctica although the East Antarctic ice sheet continues to gain ice inland. By 2100, net ice loss from Antarctica is expected to add about 11 cm (5 in) to global sea level rise. Marine ice sheet instability may cause West Antarctica to contribute tens of centimeters more if it is triggered before 2100. With higher warming, instability would be much more likely and could double the 21st-century global sea level rise.

The fresh meltwater from the ice dilutes the saline Antarctic bottom water weakening the lower cell of the Southern Ocean overturning circulation (SOOC). According to some research, a full collapse of the SOOC may occur at between 1.7 °C (3.1 °F) and 3 °C (5.4 °F) of global warming although the full effects are expected to occur over multiple centuries. They include less precipitation in the Southern Hemisphere but more in the Northern Hemisphere, an eventual decline of fisheries in the Southern Ocean and a potential collapse of certain marine ecosystems. While many Antarctic species remain undiscovered, there are documented increases in Antarctic flora, and large fauna such as penguins are already having difficulty retaining suitable habitat. On ice-free land, permafrost thaws release greenhouse gases and formerly frozen pollution. Antarctic warming and associated changes in Southern Ocean circulation can also influence climate patterns in parts of Africa, affecting regional rainfall and temperature variability.

The West Antarctic ice sheet is likely to melt completely unless temperatures are reduced by 2 °C (3.6 °F) below 2020 levels. The loss of that ice sheet would take between 500 and 13,000 years. A sea level rise of 3.3 m (10 ft 10 in) would occur if the ice sheet collapses, which would leave ice caps on the mountains, and a rise of 4.3 m (14 ft 1 in) would occur if those ice caps also melt. The far more stable East Antarctic ice sheet may cause a sea level rise of only 0.5 m (1 ft 8 in) to 0.9 m (2 ft 11 in) from the current level of warming, a small fraction of the 53.3 m (175 ft) contained in the full ice sheet. With global warming being around 3 °C (5.4 °F), vulnerable areas like Wilkes Basin and Aurora Basin may collapse over around 2,000 years, potentially adding up to 6.4 m (21 ft 0 in) to sea levels.

== Temperature and weather changes ==
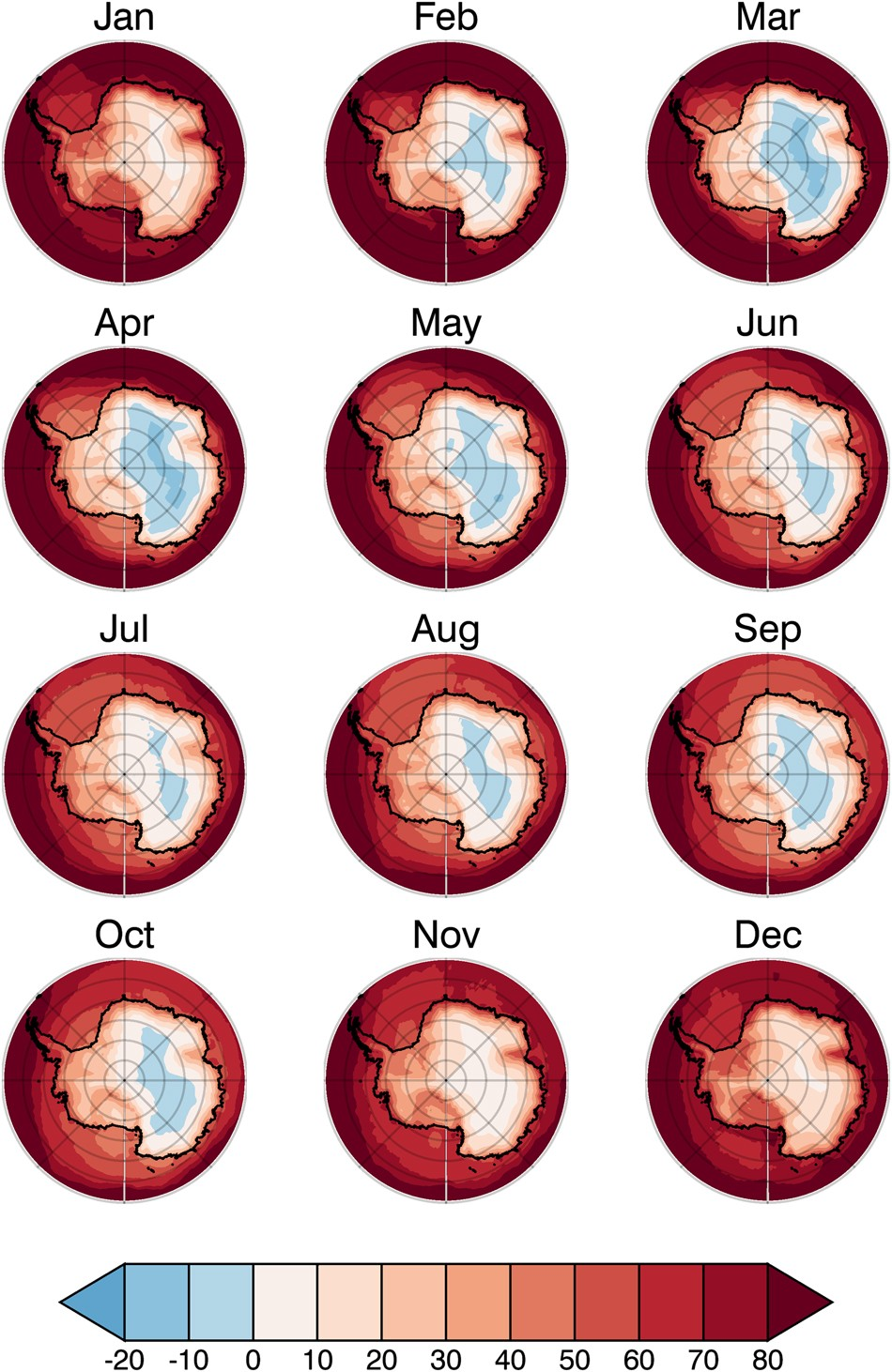
Parts of East Antarctica (marked in blue) are the only places on Earth to experience negative greenhouse effect regularly during certain months of the year. At greater warming levels, the effect is likely to disappear because of increasing concentrations of water vapor over Antarctica.

Antarctica is the coldest, driest continent on Earth, and has the highest average elevation. Antarctica's dryness means the air contains little water vapor and conducts heat poorly. The Southern Ocean surrounding the continent is far more effective at absorbing heat than any other ocean. The presence of extensive, year-round sea ice, which has a high albedo (reflectivity), adds to the albedo of the ice sheets' own bright, white surface. Antarctica's coldness makes it the only place on Earth to have an atmospheric temperature inversion occur every winter. Elsewhere on Earth, the atmosphere is at its warmest near the surface and becomes cooler as elevation increases.

During the Antarctic winter, the surface of central Antarctica becomes cooler than middle layers of the atmosphere, which makes greenhouse gases trap heat in the middle atmosphere, and reduce its flow toward the surface and toward space, rather than preventing the flow of heat from the lower atmosphere to the upper layers. The effect lasts until the end of the Antarctic winter. Early climate models predicted temperature trends over Antarctica would emerge more slowly and be more subtle than those elsewhere.

There were fewer than twenty permanent weather stations across the continent and only two in the continent's interior. Automatic weather stations were deployed relatively late, and their observational record was brief for much of the 20th century satellite temperature measurements began in 1981 and are typically limited to cloud-free conditions. Thus, datasets representing the entire continent had begun to appear only by the very end of the 20th century. The exception was the Antarctic Peninsula, where warming was pronounced and well-documented. It was eventually found to have warmed by 3 °C (5.4 °F) since the mid 20th century.

Based on those limited data, several papers published in the early 2000s said there had been an overall cooling over continental Antarctica outside the Peninsula. In particular, a 2002 analysis led by Peter Doran indicated stronger cooling than warming over Antarctica between 1966 and 2000, and found the McMurdo Dry Valleys in East Antarctica had experienced cooling of 0.7 °C per decade. The paper noted that its data was limited, and it still found warming over 42% of the continent.

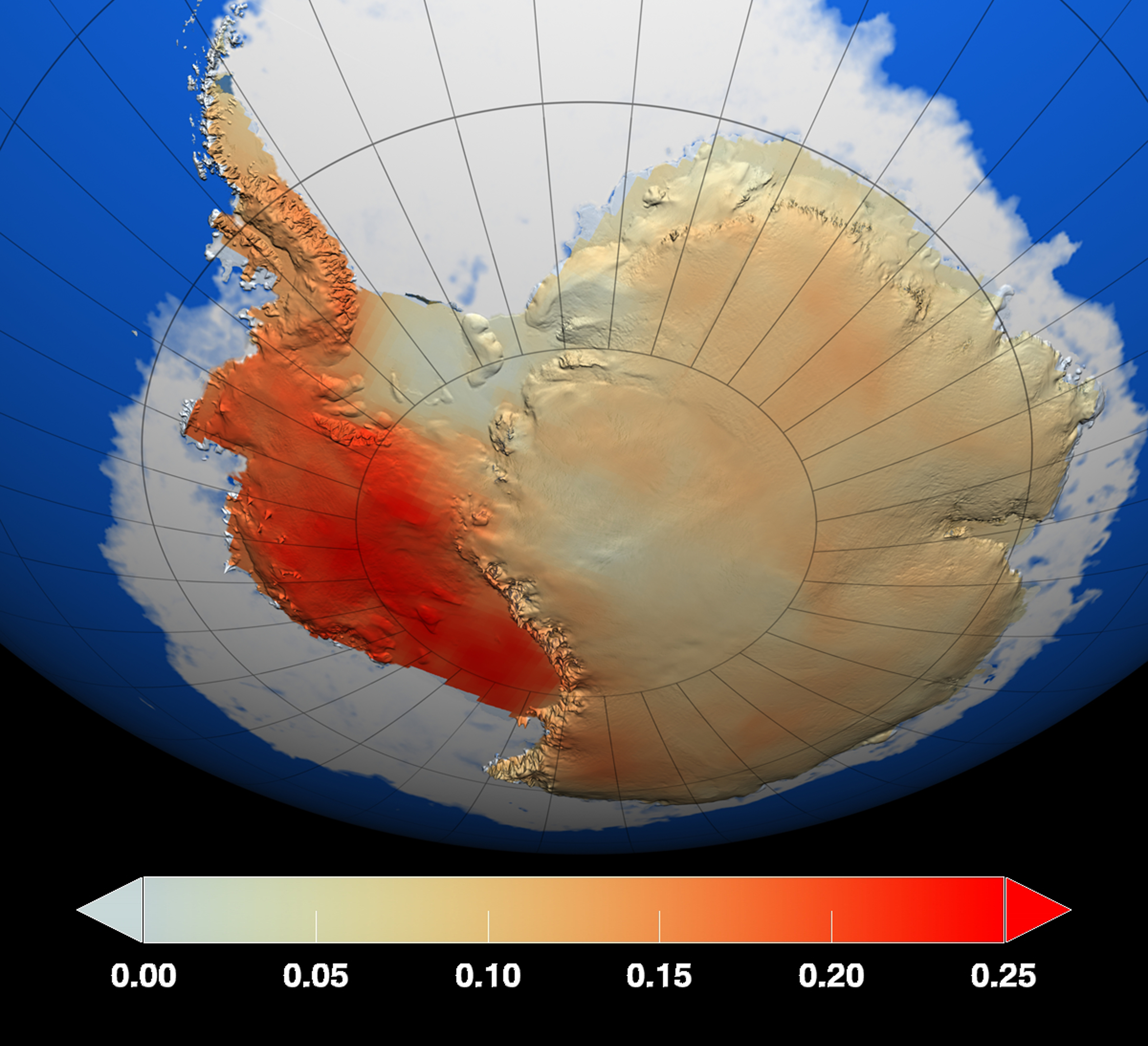
Antarctic surface temperature trends, in °C per decade, 1957-2006. Red represents areas where temperatures have increased the most since the 1950s.

The paper received widespread media coverage, as multiple journalists described those findings as "contradictory" to global warming, which was criticized by scientists at the time. The "controversy" around the cooling of Antarctica received further attention in 2004 when Michael Crichton wrote the novel State of Fear. The novel featured a fictional conspiracy among climate scientists to fake evidence of global warming, and cited Doran's study as proof that there was no warming in Antarctica outside of the Peninsula. That novel was mentioned in a 2006 US Senate hearing in support of climate change denial, and Peter Doran published a statement in The New York Times decrying the misinterpretation of his work. The British Antarctic Survey and NASA also issued statements affirming the strength of climate science after the hearing.

By 2009, researchers had combined historical weather-station data with satellite measurements to create consistent temperature records going back to 1957 that demonstrated warming of >0.05 °C per decade across the continent, with cooling in East Antarctica offset by the average temperature increase of at least 0.176 ± 0.06 °C per decade in West Antarctica. That paper was widely reported on, and subsequent research confirmed clear warming over West Antarctica in the 20th century, the only uncertainty being the magnitude.

During 2012–2013, estimates based on WAIS Divide ice cores and revised temperature records from Byrd Station suggested a much-larger West-Antarctica warming of 2.4 °C (4.3 °F) since 1958, or around 0.46 °C (0.83 °F) per decade, but some scientists continued to emphasize uncertainty. In 2022, a study narrowed the warming of the Central area of the West Antarctic Ice Sheet between 1959 and 2000 to 0.31 °C (0.56 °F) per decade, and conclusively attributed it to increases in greenhouse gas concentrations caused by human activity. Likewise, the strong cooling at McMurdo Dry Valleys was confirmed to be a local trend.

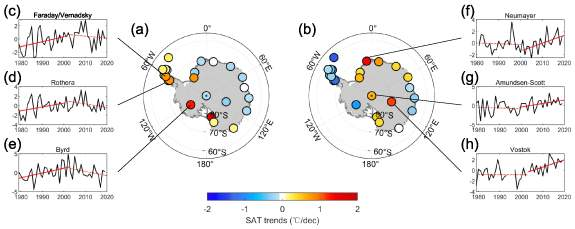
East Antarctica cooled in the 1980s and the 1990s even as West Antarctica warmed (left-hand side). That trend largely reversed in the 2000s and the 2010s (right-hand side).

The Antarctica-wide warming trend continued after 2000, and in February 2020, the continent recorded its highest-ever temperature of 18.3 °C, exceeding the previous record of 17.5 °C in March 2015. The East Antarctica interior also demonstrated clear warming between 2000 and 2020. In particular, the South Pole warmed by 0.61 ± 0.34 °C per decade between 1990 and 2020, which is three times the global average.

Changes in atmospheric circulation patterns like the Interdecadal Pacific Oscillation (IPO) and the Southern Annular Mode (SAM) slowed or partially reversed the warming of West Antarctica, with the Antarctic Peninsula experiencing cooling from 2002. While a variability in those patterns is natural, past ozone depletion had also led the SAM to be stronger than it had been in the past 600 years of observations. Starting around 2002, studies predicted a reversal in the SAM once the ozone layer began to recover following the Montreal Protocol, and those changes are consistent with their predictions.

Under the most intense climate change scenario, known as RCP8.5, models predict Antarctic surface temperatures to rise by 3 °C (5.4 °F) by 2070 and by 4 °C (7.2 °F) on average by 2100, which will be accompanied by a 30% increase in precipitation and a 30% decrease in sea ice by 2100. The Southern Ocean waters "south of 50° S latitude would also warm by about 1.9 °C (3.4 °F) by 2070. RCPs were developed in the late 2000s, and early 2020s research considers RCP8.5 much less likely than the more-moderate scenarios like RCP 4.5, which lie in between the worst-case scenario and the Paris Agreement goals. If a low-emission scenario mostly consistent with the Paris Agreement goals is followed, then Antarctica would experience surface and ocean warming of less than 1 °C (1.8 °F) by 2070, while less than 15% of sea ice would be lost and precipitation would increase by less than 10%.

=== Effects on ocean currents ===
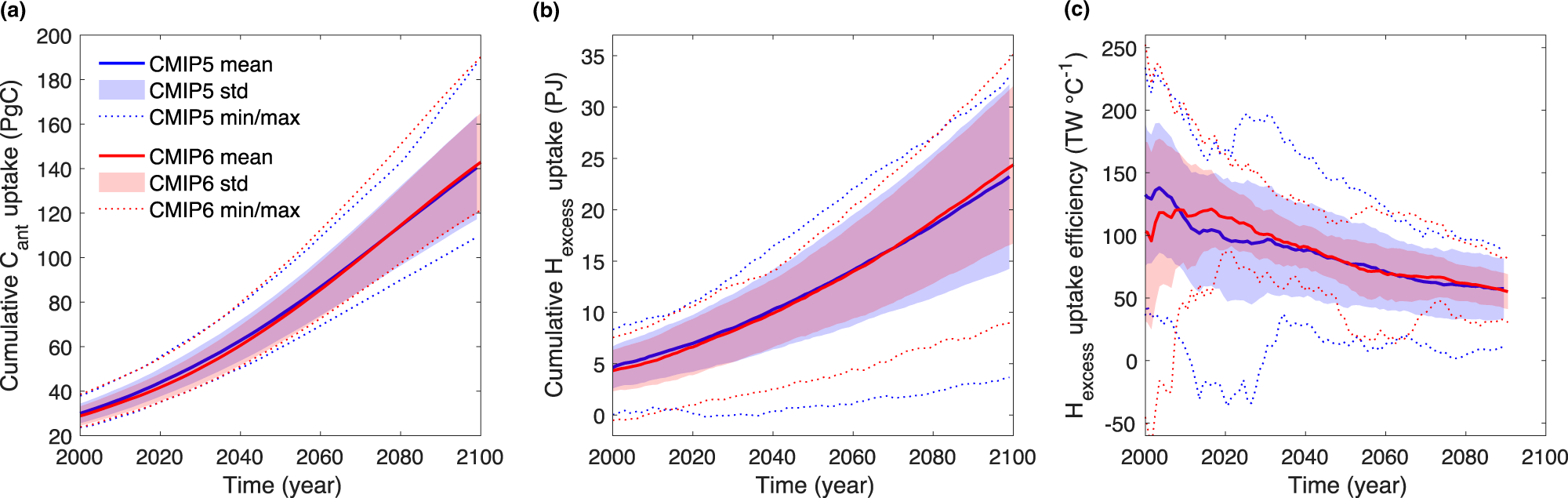
Even under the most intense climate change scenario, which is currently considered unlikely, the Southern Ocean would continue to take up an increasing amount of carbon dioxide (left) and heat (middle) during the 21st century. However, it would take up a smaller fraction of heat (right) and emissions per every additional degree of warming when compared to now.

Between 1971 and 2018, over 90% of thermal energy from global heating entered the oceans. The Southern Ocean absorbs the most heat; after 2005, it accounted for between 67% and 98% of all heat entering the oceans. The temperature in the ocean's upper layer in West Antarctica has warmed by 1 °C (1.8 °F) since 1955, and the Antarctic Circumpolar Current (ACC) is also warming faster than the average. It is also a highly important carbon sink. Those properties are connected to the Southern Ocean overturning circulation (SOOC), one half of the global thermohaline circulation. As such, estimates on when global warming will reach 2 °C (3.6 °F) – inevitable in all scenarios where greenhouse gas emissions have not been significantly lowered – depend on the strength of the circulation more than any factor other than the overall emissions.

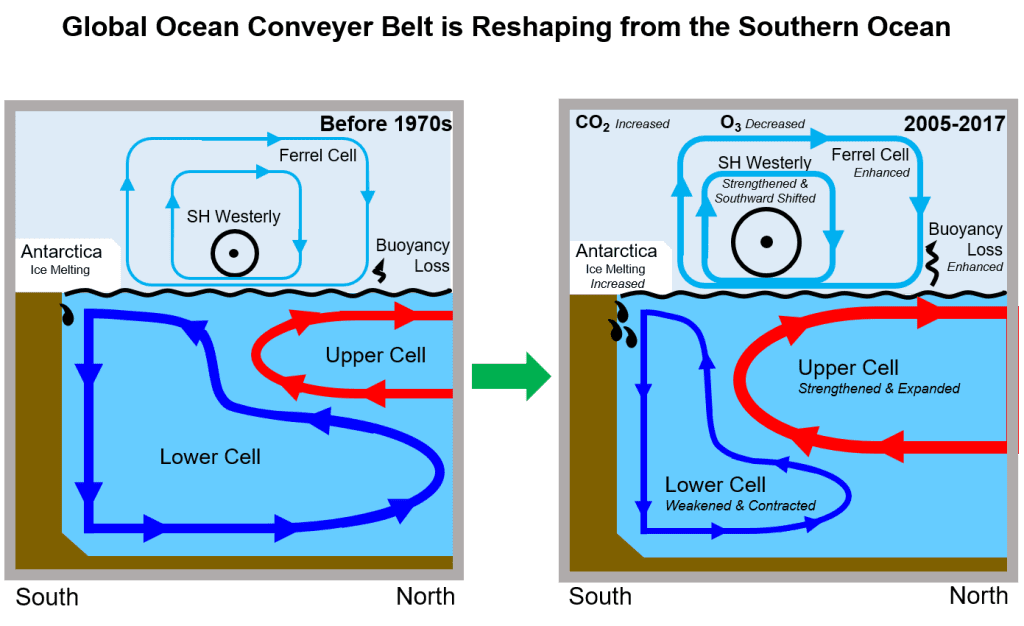
Since the 1970s, the upper cell of the circulation has strengthened, while the lower cell weakened.

The overturning circulation has two parts; the smaller upper cell, which is most-strongly affected by winds and precipitation, and the larger lower cell that is defined by the temperature and salinity of Antarctic bottom water. Since the 1970s, the upper cell has strengthened by 50–60%, and the lower cell has weakened by 10–20%. The natural cycle of the Interdecadal Pacific Oscillation (IPO) contributed to some of the change, but climate change has also played a clear role by shifting the Southern Annular Mode (SAM) pattern, which alters winds and precipitation.

Fresh meltwater from the erosion of the West Antarctic ice sheet dilutes the more-saline Antarctic bottom water, which flows at a rate of 1100–1500 billion tons (GT) per year. During the 2010s, a temporary reduction in ice-shelf melting in West Antarctica allowed for the partial recovery of Antarctic bottom water and the lower cell of the circulation. Greater melting and further decline of the circulation is expected in the future.

As bottom water weakens, and the flow of warmer, fresher waters strengthens near the surface, the surface waters become more buoyant and less likely to sink and mix with the lower layers, which increases ocean stratification. One study says the strength of the circulation would halve by 2050 under the worst climate-change scenario, with greater losses occurring afterwards. Paleoclimate evidence shows the entire circulation has significantly weakened or completely collapsed in the past; preliminary research says such a collapse may become likely once global warming reaches between 1.7 °C (3.1 °F) and 3 °C (5.4 °F). That estimate is much less certain than for the majority of tipping points in the climate system.

Such a collapse would be prolonged; one estimate places it sometime before 2300, rather than in this century. As with the better-studied Atlantic meridional overturning circulation (AMOC), a major slowing or collapse of the SOOC would have substantial regional and global effects. Some likely effects include a decline in precipitation in Southern Hemisphere countries like Australia, a corresponding increase in precipitation in the Northern Hemisphere, and an eventual decline of fisheries in the Southern Ocean, which could lead to a potential collapse of some marine ecosystems. Those effects are expected to occur over centuries, but there has been limited research to date and few specifics are currently known.

=== Impacts on Africa ===
Changes in Antarctic ice and Southern Ocean circulation influence global climate patterns, including rainfall and temperature variability in Africa. Antarctic warming affects the Antarctic Circumpolar Current and Agulhas Current, which transport heat and moisture across the Southern Hemisphere. Scientific programs, including South Africa's South African National Antarctic Programme, monitor Antarctic climate processes and their downstream impacts, supporting regional climate adaptation strategies.

== Effects on the cryosphere ==
=== Observed changes in ice mass ===
Mass change of ice in Antarctica, 2002–2023

The extent (area) of Antarctic sea ice reached a new low in 2023. Chart shows how little sea ice remains in the Antarctic summer, which at one point in February 2023 was only about 60% of its 1981–2010 average.

Contrasting temperature trends across parts of Antarctica mean that some locations, particularly at the coasts, lose mass while locations further inland continue to gain mass. Those contrasting trends and the remoteness of the region make estimating an average trend difficult.

In 2018, a systematic review of all previous studies and data by the Ice Sheet Mass Balance Inter-comparison Exercise (IMBIE) estimated an increase in the West Antarctic ice sheet from 53 ± 29 Gt (gigatonnes) in 1992 to 159 ± 26 Gt in the final five years of the study. On the Antarctic Peninsula, the study estimated a loss of 20 ± 15 Gt per year with an increase in loss of roughly 15 Gt per year after 2000, a significant quantity of which was the loss of ice shelves. The review's overall estimate was that Antarctica lost 2,720 ± 1,390 gigatons of ice from 1992 to 2017, averaging 109 ± 56 Gt per year. That would amount to 7.6 mm (0.30 in) of sea level rise.

A 2021 analysis of data from four research satellite systems (Envisat, European Remote-Sensing Satellite, GRACE and GRACE-FO, and ICESat) indicated an annual mass loss of about 12 Gt from 2012 to 2016 because of much greater ice gain in East Antarctica than was earlier estimated, which offset most of the losses from West Antarctica.

The East Antarctic ice sheet can still gain mass despite warming because effects of climate change on the water cycle increase precipitation over its surface, which then freezes and helps to accrete more ice. According to a study in 2023, the total area of Antarctic ice shelves increased by approximately 5,305 km² (about 0.4%) between 2009 and 2019, as the growth of the largest ice shelves in East Antarctica outweighed concurrent losses from ice shelves in West Antarctica and the Antarctic Peninsula. Slight net increases in some isolated years or increases in ice shelves are sometimes reported, but that does not contradict the net decrease that the Antarctic sea ice has undergone for decades.

==== Black carbon pollution ====
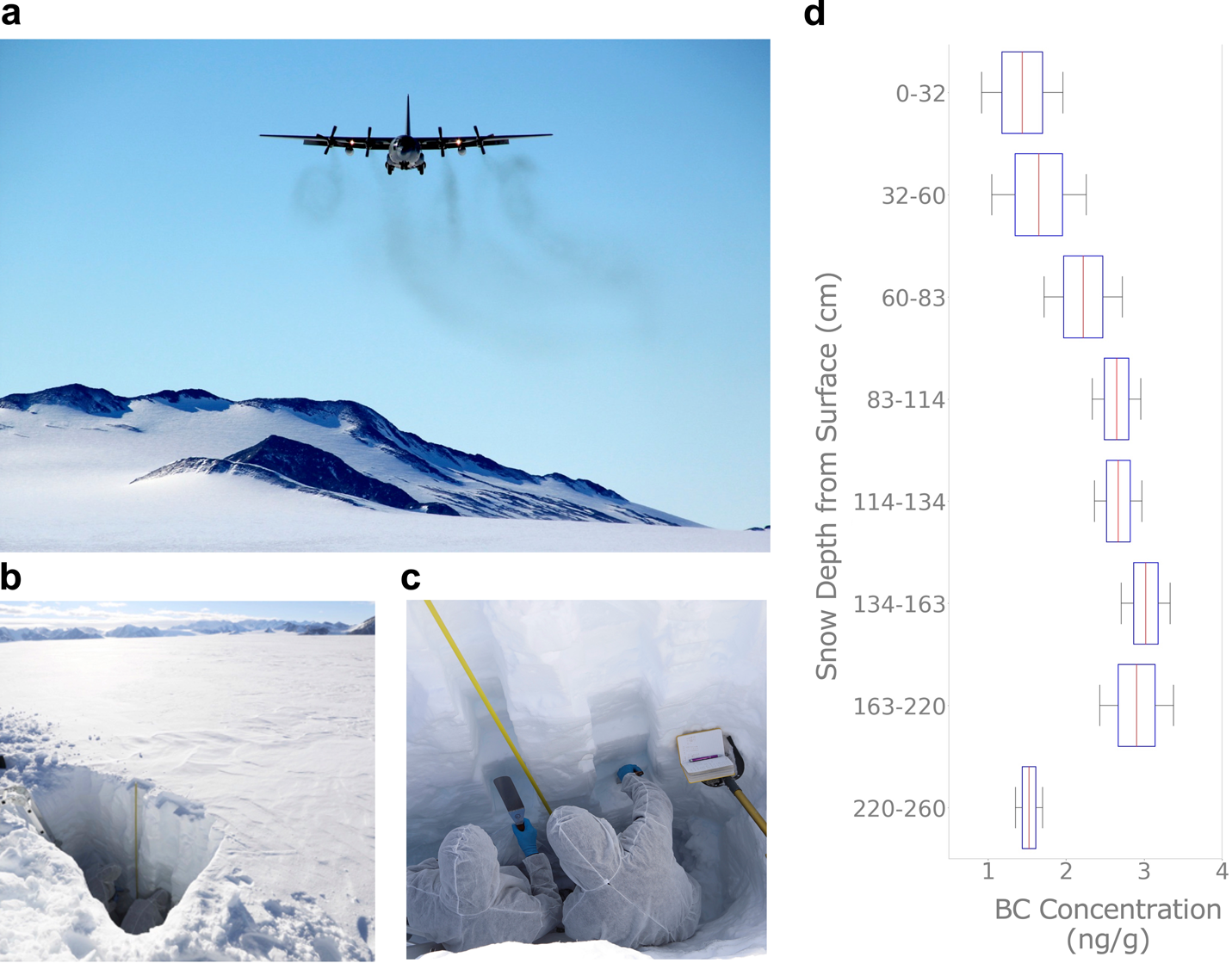
A C-130 airplane landing onto an ice runway at Union Glacier (upper-left), which causes black carbon concentrations to increase in the surrounding snow (right), as observed through sample collection (lower-left)

Black carbon from incomplete fuel combustion is carried long distances by wind. If it reaches Antarctica, black carbon accumulates on snow and ice, which reduces its reflectivity and causes it to absorb more energy. That accelerates melting and can create an ice-albedo feedback loop in which meltwater itself absorbs more heat from sunlight. Its remoteness has caused Antarctica to have the cleanest snow in the world, and according to some research, the effects of black carbon across West and East Antarctica are currently minimal, with an albedo reduction of about 0.5% in one 47-year ice core.

The highest concentrations of black carbon are found on the Antarctic Peninsula, where human activity is higher than elsewhere. Black carbon deposits near common tourist sites and research stations increase summer seasonal melting by between about 5 to 23 kg (11 to 51 lb) of snow per m^{2}.

=== 21st-century ice loss and sea level rise ===
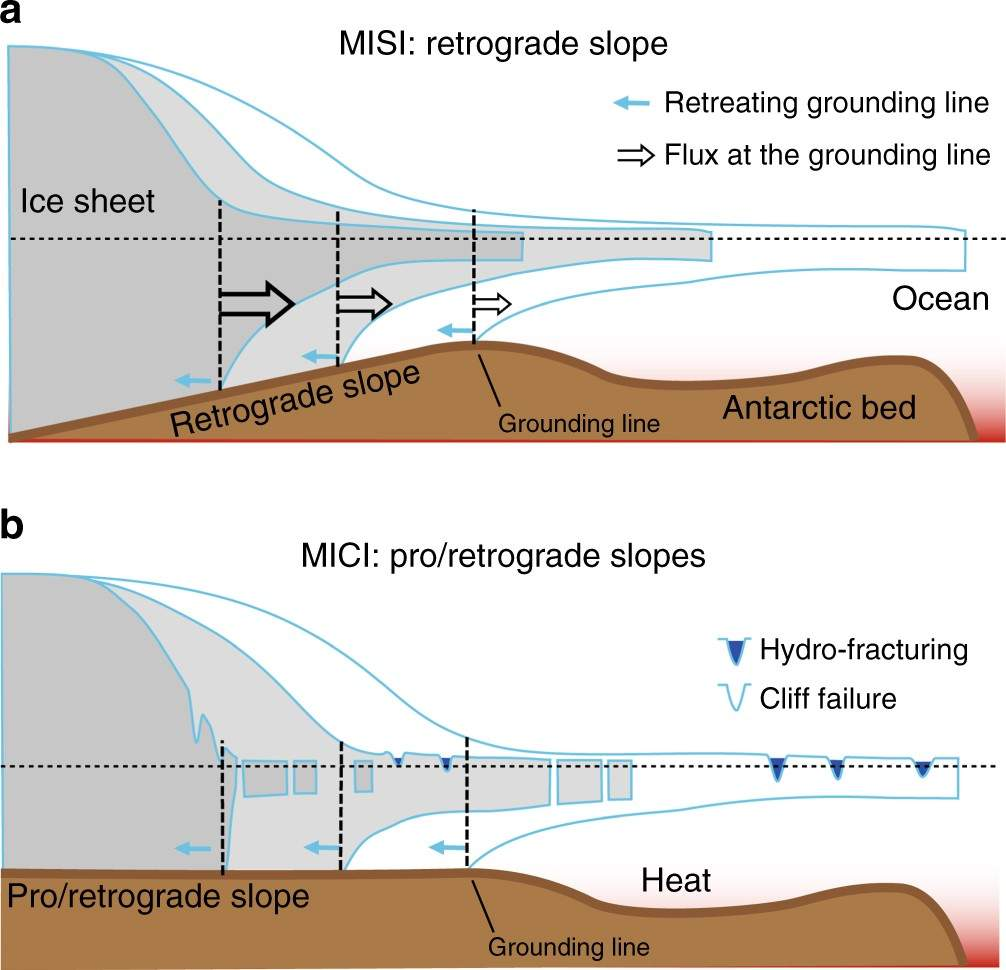
An illustration of the theory behind marine ice sheet and marine ice cliff instabilities

By 2100, net ice loss from Antarctica is expected to add about 11 cm (4.3 in) to the global sea level rise. Other processes may cause West Antarctica to contribute more to sea level rise. Marine ice sheet instability is the potential for warm water currents to enter between the seafloor and the base of the ice sheet, once the sheet is no longer heavy enough to displace such flows. Marine ice cliff instability may cause ice cliffs that are taller than 100 m (330 ft) to collapse under their own weight once they are no longer buttressed by ice shelves. That process has never been observed and occurs only in some models. By 2100, those processes may increase the sea level rise caused by Antarctica to 41 cm (16 in) under the low-emission scenario and by 57 cm (22 in) under the high-emission scenario.

Some scientists have given greater estimates, but all agree melting in Antarctica would have a greater impact and would be much more likely to occur under higher-warming scenarios under which it may double the overall 21st-century sea level rise to 2 m (7 ft) or more. According to one study, if the Paris Agreement is followed and global warming is limited to 2 °C (3.6 °F), the loss of ice in Antarctica will continue at the 2020 rate for the rest of the 21st century, but if a trajectory leading to 3 °C (5.4 °F) is followed, Antarctica ice loss will accelerate after 2060 and start adding 0.5 cm (0.20 in) per year to global sea levels by 2100.

=== Long-term sea level rise ===
If countries cut greenhouse gas emissions significantly (lowest trace), sea level rise by 2100 can be limited to 0.3–0.6 m (1–2 ft). If the emissions instead accelerate rapidly (top trace), sea levels could rise 5 m (16 1/2 ft) by the year 2300. Higher levels of sea level rise would involve substantial ice loss from Antarctica, including East Antarctica.

Sea levels will continue to rise long after 2100 but potentially at very different rates. According to the most-recent reports of the Intergovernmental Panel on Climate Change (SROCC and the IPCC Sixth Assessment Report), there will be a median rise of 16 cm (6.3 in) and maximum rise of 37 cm (15 in) under the low-emission scenario. The highest-emission scenario results in a median rise of 1.46 m (5 ft) with a minimum of 60 cm (2 ft) and a maximum of 2.89 m (9 1/2 ft).

Over longer timescales, the West Antarctic ice sheet, which is much smaller than the East Antarctic ice sheet and is grounded deep below sea level, is considered highly vulnerable. The melting of all of the ice in West Antarctica would increase the global sea level rise to 4.3 m (14 ft 1 in). Mountain ice caps that are not in contact with water are less vulnerable than the majority of the ice sheet, which is located below sea level. The collapse of the West Antarctic ice sheet would cause around 3.3 m (10 ft 10 in) of sea-level rise. That kind of collapse is now considered almost inevitable because it appears to have occurred during the Eemian period 125,000 years ago, when temperatures were similar to those in the early 21st century. The Amundsen Sea also appears to be warming at rates that, if continued, make the ice sheet's collapse inevitable.

The only way to reverse ice loss from West Antarctica, once it is triggered, is to lower the global temperature to 1 °C (1.8 °F) below the pre-industrial level, to 2 °C (3.6 °F) below the 2020 temperature. Other researchers said a climate engineering intervention to stabilize the ice sheet's glaciers may delay its loss by centuries and give the environment more time to adapt. That is an uncertain proposal and would be one of the most expensive projects ever to be attempted. Otherwise, the disappearance of the West Antarctic ice sheet would take an estimated 2,000 years. The loss of West Antarctica ice would take at least 500 years and possibly as long as 13,000 years. Once the ice sheet is lost, the isostatic rebound of the land that had been covered by the ice sheet would result in an additional 1 m (3 ft 3 in) of sea level rise over the following 1,000 years.

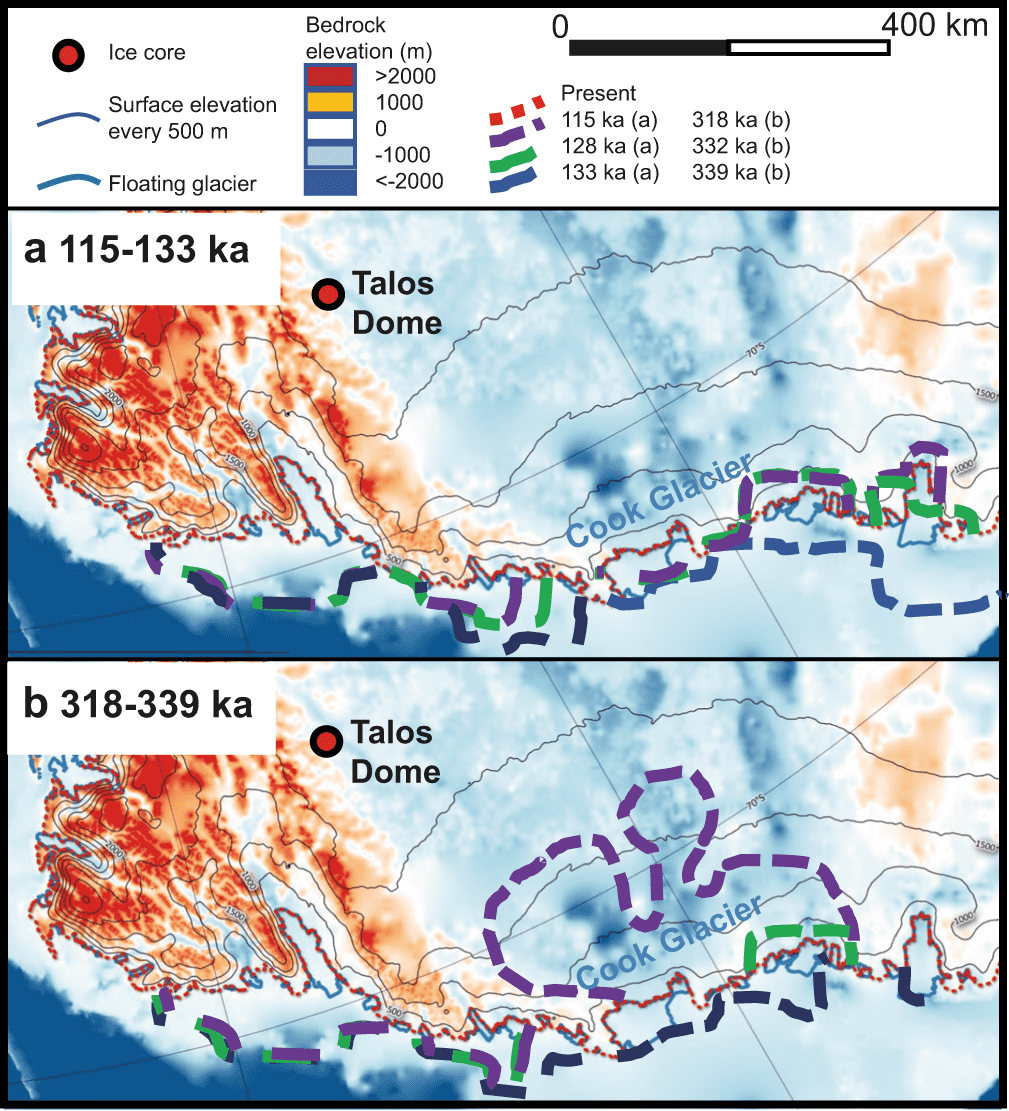
Retreat of Cook Glacier in the Wilkes Basin during the Eemian ~120,000 years ago and Pleistocene interglacial ~330,000 years ago was equivalent to 0.5 m (1 ft 8 in) and 0.9 m (2 ft 11 in) of sea level rise

The East Antarctic ice sheet is far more stable than the West Antarctic ice sheet. The loss of the entire East Antarctic ice sheet would require global warming of between 5 °C (9.0 °F) and 10 °C (18 °F), and a minimum of 10,000 years. Some of its parts, such as Totten Glacier and Wilkes Basin, are in vulnerable subglacial basins that lie below sea level. Estimates suggest the irreversible loss of those basins would begin once global warming reaches 3 °C (5.4 °F), but the loss may become irreversible at warming of between 2 °C (3.6 °F) and 6 °C (11 °F). After global warming reaches the critical threshold for the collapse of those subglacial basins, their loss will likely occur over around 2,000 years tbut may be as fast as 500 years or as slow as 10,000 years.

The loss of all of that ice would add between 1.4 m (4 ft 7 in) and 6.4 m (21 ft 0 in) to sea levels depending on the ice sheet model that is used. Isostatic rebound of the newly ice-free land would add between 8 cm (3.1 in) and 57 cm (1 ft 10 in). Evidence from the Pleistocene shows partial loss can occur at lower warming levels; Wilkes Basin is estimated to have lost enough ice to add 0.5 m (1 ft 8 in) to sea levels between 115,000 and 129,000 years ago during the Eemian, and about 0.9 m (2 ft 11 in) between 318,000 and 339,000 years ago during Marine Isotope Stage 9.

=== Permafrost thaw ===
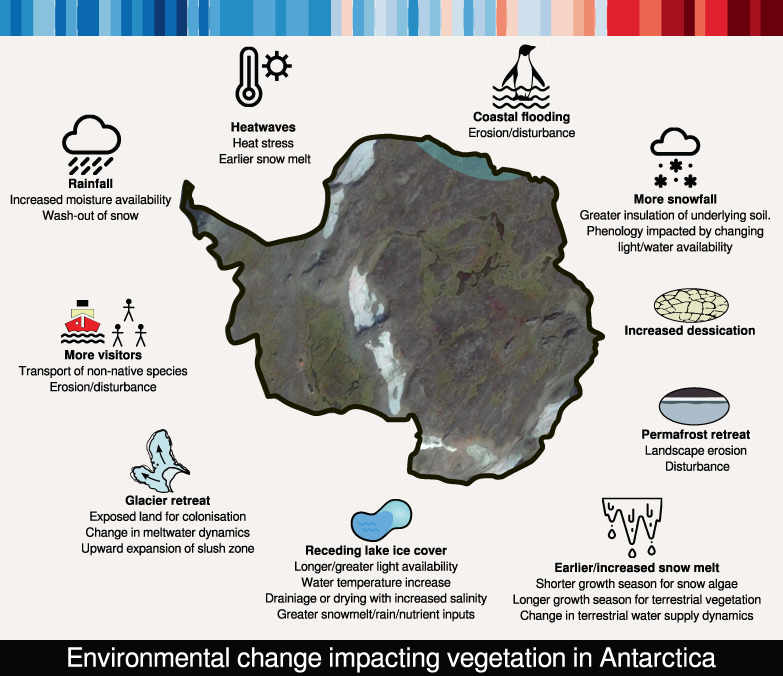
Permafrost thaw is one of the ongoing processes that reshape a warming Antarctica

Antarctica has much less permafrost than the Arctic. Like in the Arctic, warming causes Antarctic permafrost to thaw, causing erosion of the soil and reshaping plant distribution. The permafrost in Antarctica traps various compounds, including persistent organic pollutants (POPs) like polycyclic aromatic hydrocarbons, many of which are known carcinogens or can cause liver damage; and polychlorinated biphenyls such as hexachlorobenzene (HCB) and DDT, which are associated with decreased reproductive success and immunohematological disorders.

Antarctic soils also contain heavy metals, including mercury, lead and cadmium, all of which can cause endocrine disruption, DNA damage, immunotoxicity and reproductive toxicity. Those compounds are released when contaminated permafrost thaws, which can change the chemistry of surface water. Bioaccumulation and biomagnification spread those compounds throughout the food web. Permafrost thaw also results in greenhouse gas emissions, but the limited volume of Antarctic permafrost relative to Arctic permafrost means that Antarctic permafrost is not considered a significant cause of climate change.

== Ecological effects ==
=== Marine ecosystems ===
Nearly all of the species in the Antarctic are marine; by 2015, 8,354 species had been discovered in Antarctica and taxonomically accepted, only 57 of which were not marine. Antarctica may have up to 17,000 species; while 90% of the ocean around Antarctica is deeper than 1,000 m (3,281 ft), only 30% of the benthic-sample locations were taken at that depth. On the Antarctic continental shelves, bethnic-zone biomass may increase because of oceanic warming, which is likely to be of most benefit to seaweed. Around 12% of the native benthic species may be outcompeted and go extinct. Those estimates are preliminary; the vulnerabilities of most Antarctic species have yet to be assessed.

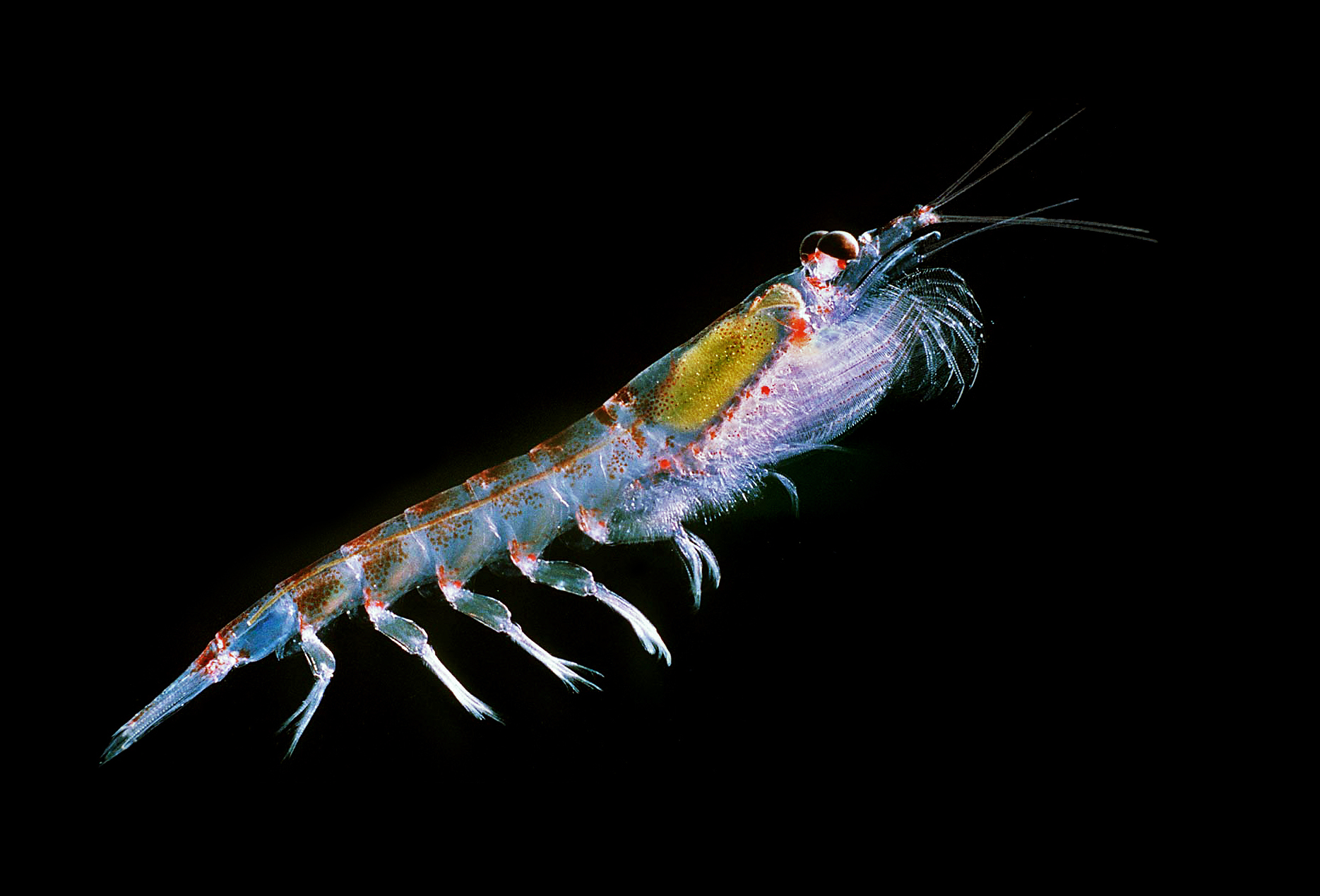
The populations of Antarctic krill (Euphasia superba) appear to have been declining in parts of the Southwest Atlantic Ocean since the 1970s.

Unlike in the Arctic, there has been little change in marine primary production across the Southern Ocean in the available observations. Estimates say an increase in Southern Ocean primary production could occur after 2100; the increase would block many nutrients from travelling to other oceans and lead to decreased production elsewhere. Some microbial communities appear to have been negatively affected by ocean acidification, and there is a risk future acidification would threaten the eggs of pteropods, a type of zooplankton.

Antarctic krill are a key species in the Antarctic food web. They feed on phytoplankton, and are the main food for fish and penguins. Krill numbers appear to have been declining in parts of the Southwest Atlantic Ocean since the 1970s. In the future, Antarctic krill are likely to abandon the fastest-warming areas, such as the Weddell Sea, while icefish may find shelf waters around Antarctic islands unsuitable. Species like salps are likely to replace krill in the areas that they abandon.

The shifts or decreases in krill and copepod numbers are known to prevent the recovery in numbers of baleen whale following the declines caused by historical whaling. Without a reversal in temperature increases, baleen whales are likely to be forced to adapt their migratory patterns or face local extinction. Many other marine species are expected to move into Antarctic waters as the oceans continue to warm, forcing native species to compete with them. Some research says at 3 °C (5.4 °F) of warming, the diversity of Antarctic species would decline by nearly 17% and the suitable climate area would shrink by 50%. Overall fishery value of the region may decline under high warming.

=== Penguins ===
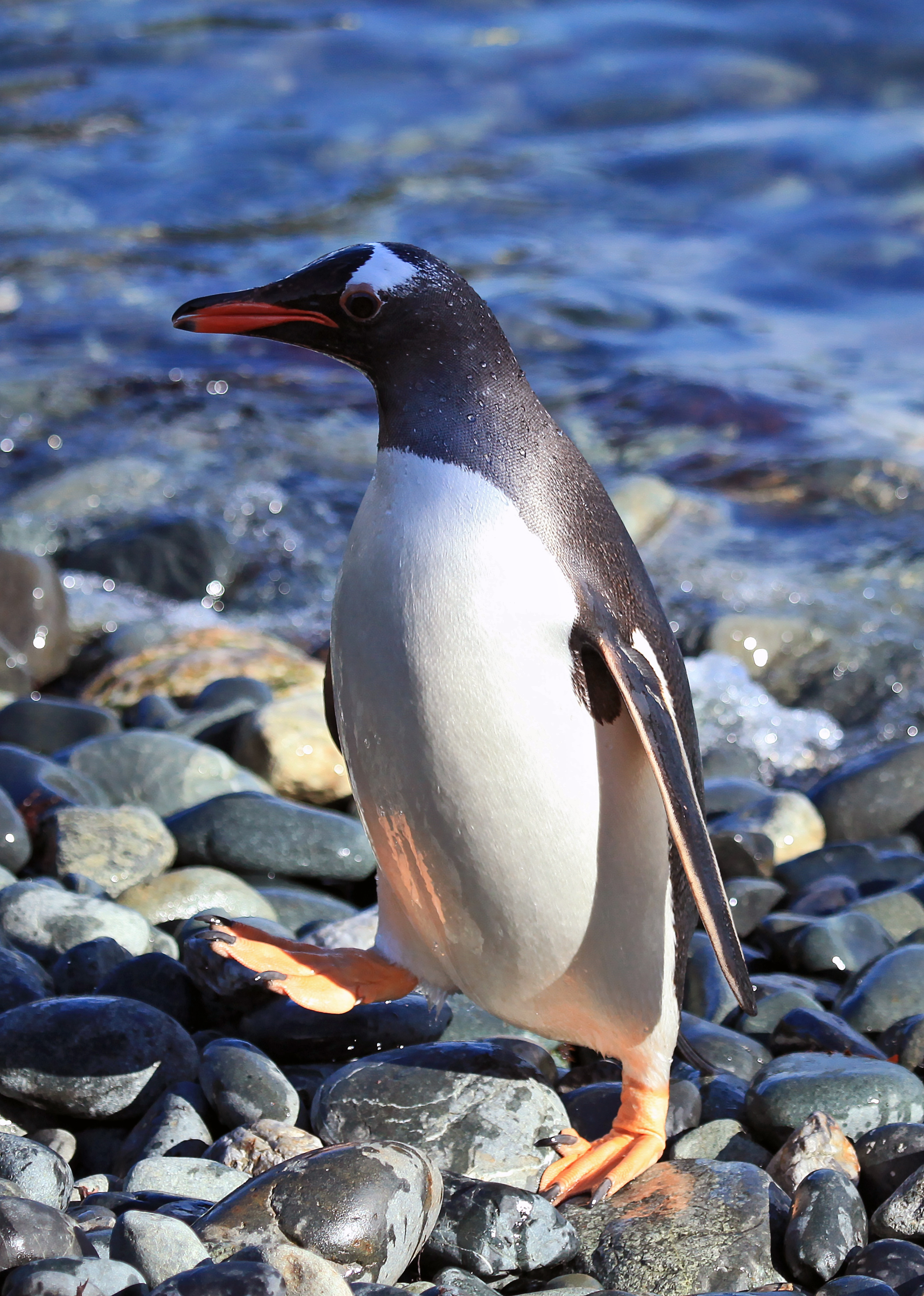
Gentoo penguins (Pygoscelis papua) nest only in ice-free areas, which allows them to benefit from climate change, unlike the other known penguin species.

Penguins are the highest species in the Antarctic food web and are already being substantially affected by climate change. Numbers of Adélie penguins, chinstrap penguins, emperor penguin and king penguins have already been declining, while the number of gentoo penguins has increased. Gentoo penguins, which are ice intolerant and use mosses as nesting material, spread into previously-inaccessible territories and substantially increased in number. The vulnerable penguin species can respond through acclimatization, adaptation, or range shift. Range shift through dispersal leads to colonization elsewhere but results in local extinction.

As early as 2008, it was estimated every Southern Ocean temperature increase of 0.26 °C (0.47 °F) reduces king penguin populations by nine percent. Under the worst-case warming scenario, king penguins will permanently lose at least two of their current eight breeding sites, and 70% of the species (1.1 million pairs) will have to relocate to avoid extinction. Emperor penguin populations may be at a similar risk; with no climate mitigation, 80% of populations are at risk of extinction by 2100. With Paris Agreement temperature goals in place, that number may fall to 31% under the 2 °C (3.6 °F) goal, and to 19% under the 1.5 °C (2.7 °F) goal.

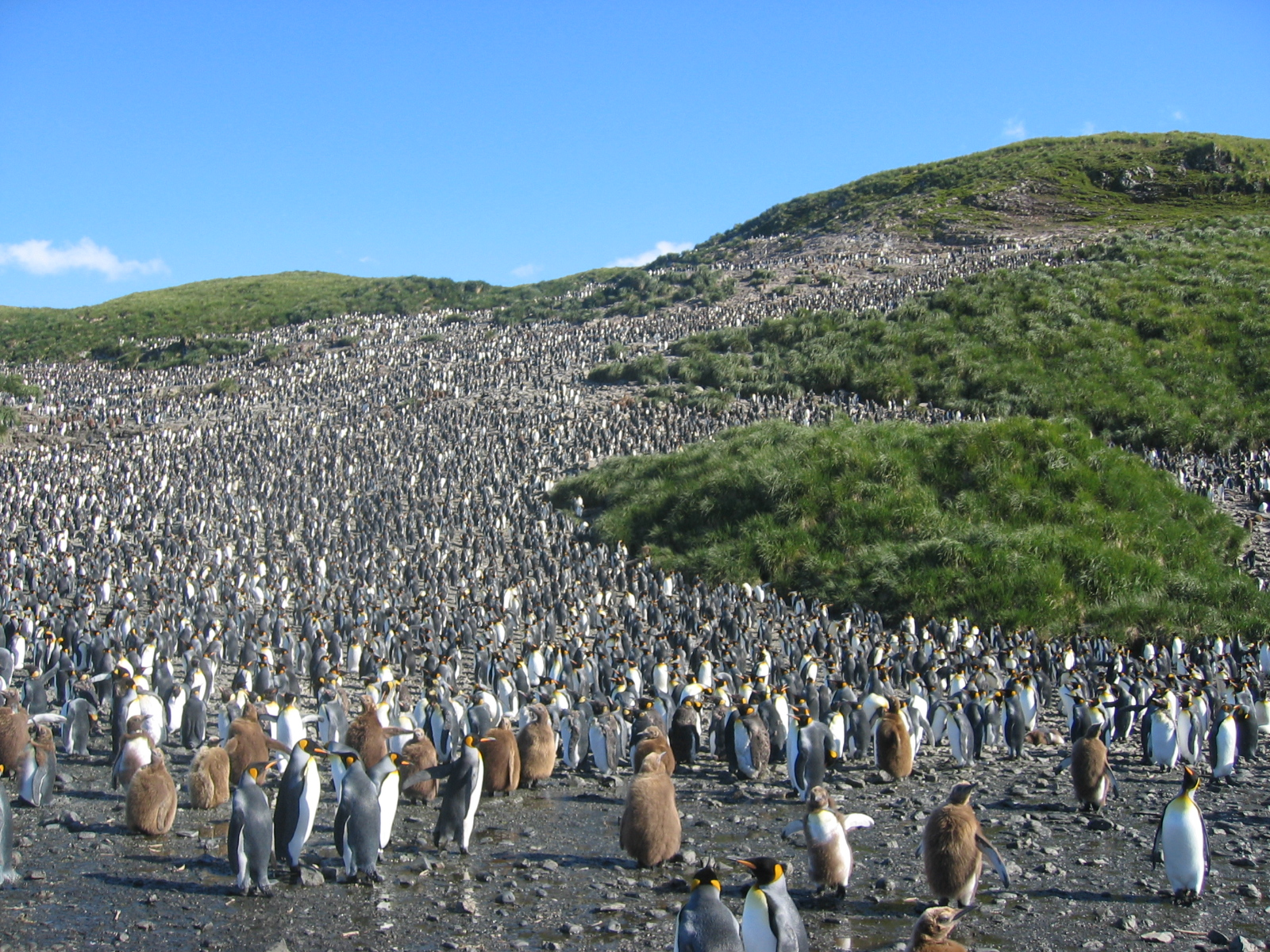
King penguins are threatened by climate change in Antarctica.

A 27-year study of the largest colony of Magellanic penguins that was published in 2014 found extreme weather caused by climate change kills seven percent of penguin chicks in an average year, accounting for up to 50% of all chick deaths in some years. Since 1987, the number of breeding pairs in the colony has fallen by 24%. Chinstrap penguins are also in decline, mainly because of a corresponding decline of Antarctic krill. It is estimated while Adélie penguins will retain some habitat past 2099, one-third of colonies along the West Antarctic Peninsula – around 20% of the species – will be in decline by 2060.

=== Terrestrial ecosystems ===
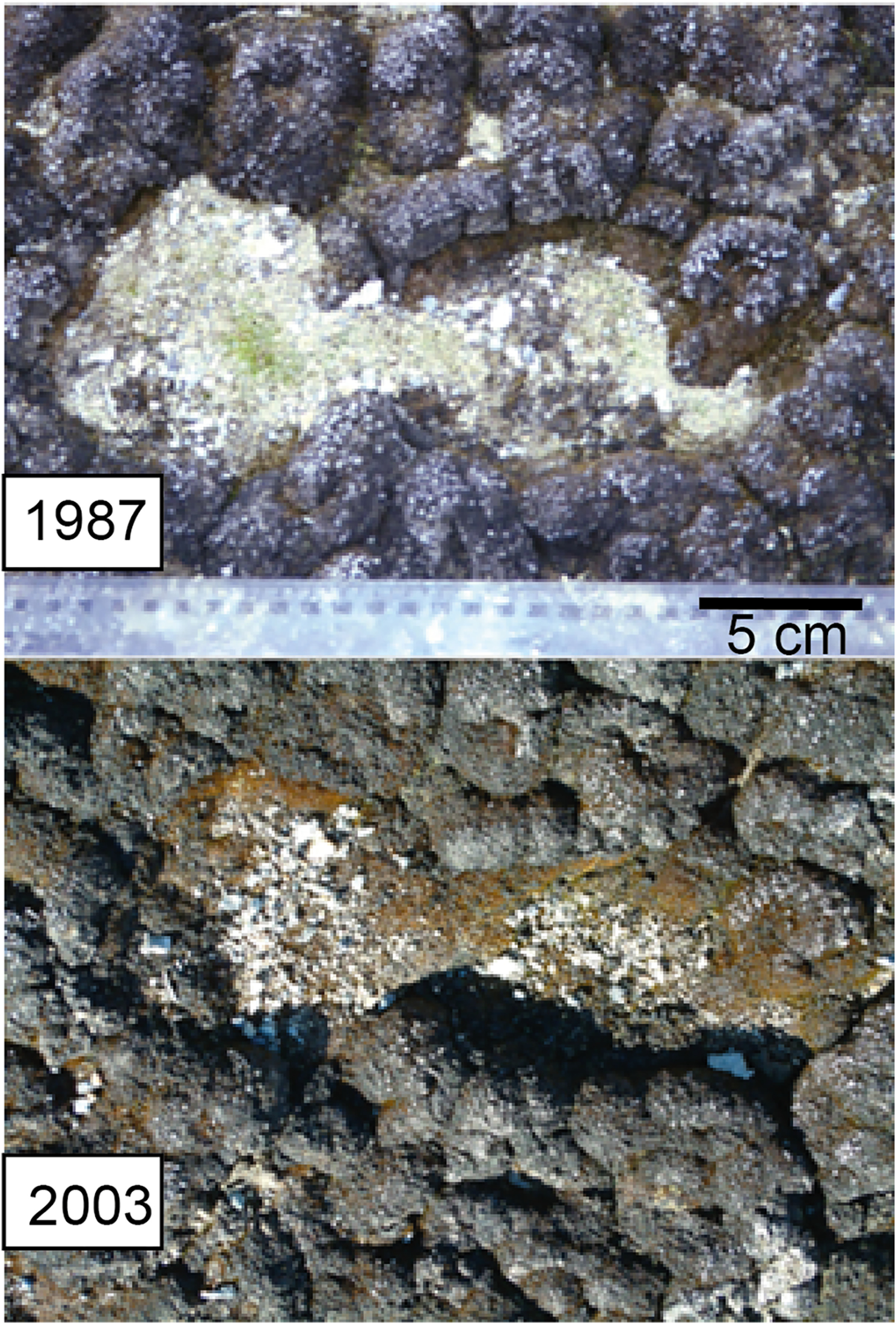
A footprint left in Taylor Valley in 1987 persists in 2003, and the trampled moss community remains disturbed.

On the Antarctic continent, lichens (386 known species), mosses (133 species), ice algae, and liverworts (27 species) are mainly found in coastal areas. In the Antarctic Peninsula, green snow algae have a combined biomass of around 1,300 t (2,900,000 lb). As glaciers retreat, they expose areas that often become colonized by pioneer lichen species. Warming of the Antarctic Peninsula had increased growth rates of mosses four-fold. Moss populations in areas of Antarctica that have become drier have deteriorated in spite of that warming.

The reduction in precipitation in East Antarctica had turned many green mosses from green to red or brown as they respond to the drought. Schistidium antarctici had declined, while the desiccation-tolerant species Bryum pseudotriquetrum and Ceratodon purpureus have increased. Likewise, lichens have grown more rapidly because of warming in places that it does not interfere with precipitation, such as on Livingston Island, but declined in places that snowfall had become more intense and buries them more often, like on the South Shetland Islands.

The Antarctic ozone hole has led to an increase in UV-B radiation, which causes observed damage to living cells, reducing their capacity to photosynthesize. Greater warming brings more people to Antarctica, and local flora had never experienced their presence before, as even footprints directly modify their habitat. One estimate suggests every additional person at an Antarctica research station on average disturbs an area close to 1,000 football fields.

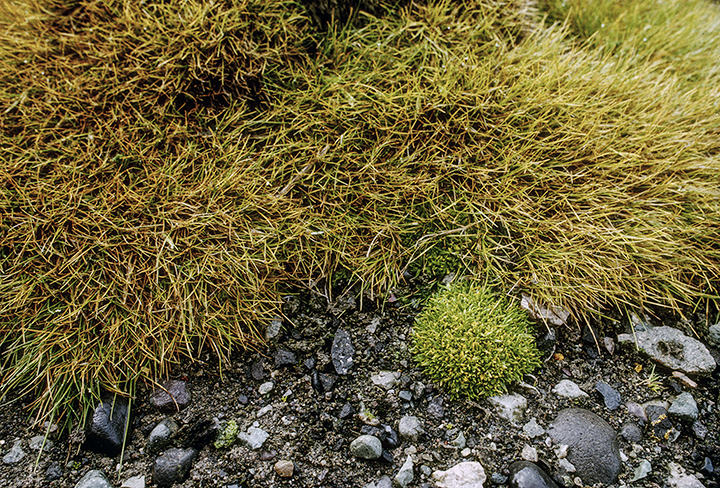
Antarctica's only flowering plants, Antarctic hairgrass (top) and Antarctic pearlwort (bottom). With warming, other species are expected to invade and begin to compete with them.

The only native vascular plants on continental Antarctica are Antarctic hairgrass and Antarctic pearlwort, which are found on the Antarctic Peninsula. Increased temperatures have boosted photosynthesis and allowed those species to increase their population and range. Other plant species are increasingly likely to spread to Antarctica as the climate continues to warm and as human activity on the continent increases. Annual bluegrass already maintains stable populations on the Antarctic islands, and it is expected to become successfully established in coastal Antarctica around midcentury under high warming. Based on seed trait analysis, 16 other species are considered capable of invading Antarctica successfully in the near future.

== Effects of human development ==
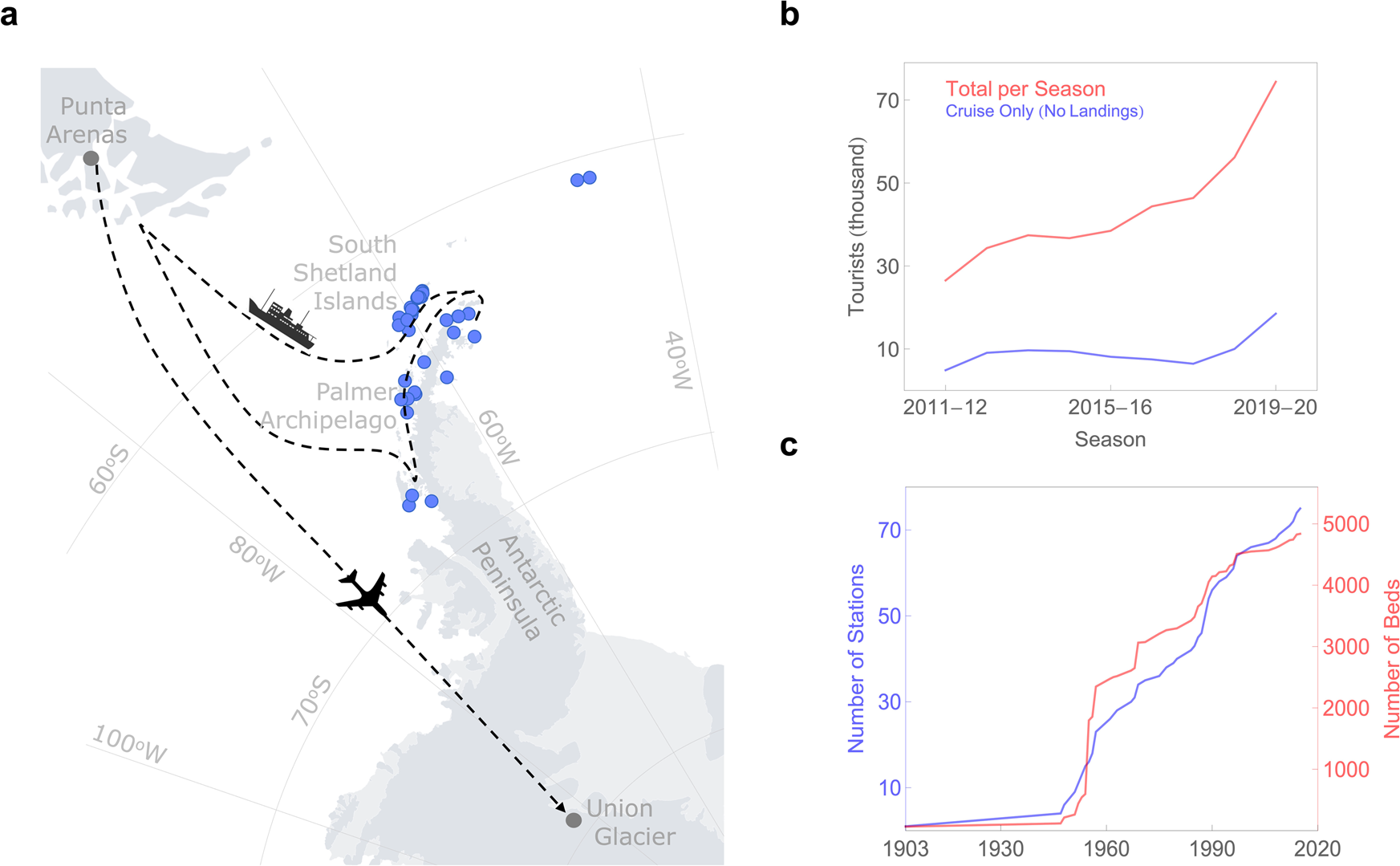
The number of Antarctic research stations has grown since the 20th century. Major growth in tourism occurred during the 2010s.

Tourism in Antarctica has significantly increased since 2020; 74,400 tourists arrived there in late 2019 and early 2020. The development of Antarctica for the purposes of industry, tourism, and an increase in research facilities may put pressure on the continent and threaten its status as largely untouched land. Regulated tourism in Antarctica brings about awareness, and encourages the investment and public support needed to preserve Antarctica's distinctive environment. An unmitigated loss of ice on land and sea could greatly reduce its attractiveness.

Policy can be used to increase climate-change resilience through the protection of ecosystems. Ships that operate in Antarctic waters adhere to the international Polar Code, which includes regulations and safety measures such as operational training and assessments, the control of oil discharge, appropriate sewage disposal, and the prevention of pollution by toxic liquids. Antarctic Specially Protected Areas (ASPA) and Antarctic Specially Managed Areas (ASMA) are designated by the Antarctic Treaty to protect flora and fauna.

Both ASPAs and ASMAs restrict entry but to different extents, with ASPAs being the highest level of protection. Designation of ASPAs has decreased 84% since the 1980s despite a rapid increase in tourism, which may bring additional stressors to the natural environment and ecosystems. To alleviate stress on Antarctic ecosystems posed by climate change and the rapid increase in tourism, much of the scientific community advocates for an increase in protected areas like ASPAs to improve Antarctica's resilience to rising temperatures.

Since late June 2025, researchers from the University of Southampton have found that surface salinity south of latitude 50° has unexpectedly increased, which reverses decades of freshening tendencies. That shift has weakened stratification, enabling warmer deep waters to rise and melt sea ice from beneath, forming historic polynyas (areas of open water, like the reappearance of the Maud Rise polynya, four times the size of Wales)

== See also ==
- 2024 Antarctica heat wave
- ANDEEP
- Climate of Antarctica
- Climate change in the Arctic
- Register of Antarctic Marine Species
