= Resolution Subglacial Highlands =

Coordinates: 73°0′S 135°0′E

Resolution Subglacial Highlands is a line of subglacial highlands in the interior of Wilkes Land, running NNW–SSE and separating Adventure Subglacial Trench from Wilkes Subglacial Basin. The feature was delineated by the Scott Polar Research Institute (SPRI)–National Science Foundation (NSF)–Technical University of Denmark (TUD) airborne radio echo sounding program, 1967–79, and was named after HMS Resolution, flagship of the British expedition, 1772–75 (Captain James Cook, RN).
