= Vincennes Subglacial Basin =

Geographic area in Antarctica

Vincennes Subglacial Basin (73°30′S 122°0′E) is a subglacial basin to the north of Dome Charlie in Wilkes Land, running ENE-WSW and joining Aurora Subglacial Basin with Adventure Subglacial Trench. The feature was delineated by the Scott Polar Research Institute (SPRI)-National Science Foundation (NSF)-Technical University of Denmark (TUD) airborne radio echo sounding program, 1967–79, and named after Vincennes, the command ship of the United States Exploring Expedition, 1838-42 (Lieutenant Charles Wilkes, USN).
