= East Antarctic Ice Sheet =

Segment of the continental ice sheet that covers East Antarctica

Coordinates: 80°S 60°E

- Interactive map of East Antarctic Ice Sheet
- Type: Ice sheet
- Area: 10,200,000 km^{2} (3,900,000 mi^{2})
- Thickness: ~2.2 km (1.4 mi) (average), ~4.9 km (3.0 mi) (maximum)

The East Antarctic Ice Sheet (EAIS) is the sector of the Antarctic Ice Sheet covering East Antarctica. The ice sheet first formed around 34 million years ago, and, considered independently, is the largest ice sheet on Earth, with greater volume than the Greenland Ice Sheet or the West Antarctic Ice Sheet (WAIS). It is around 2.2 km (1.4 mi) thick on average and is 4,897 m (16,066 ft) at its thickest point. It is separated from WAIS by the Transantarctic Mountains. The EAIS is home to the geographic South Pole, magnetic south pole and the Amundsen–Scott South Pole Station.

The surface of the EAIS is the driest, windiest, and coldest place on Earth. Lack of moisture in the air, high albedo from the snow as well as the surface's consistently high elevation results in the reported cold temperature records of nearly −100 °C (−148 °F). It is the only place on Earth cold enough for atmospheric temperature inversion to occur consistently. That is, while the atmosphere is typically warmest near the surface and becomes cooler at greater elevation, atmosphere during the Antarctic winter is cooler at the surface than in its middle layers. Consequently, greenhouse gases actually trap heat in the middle atmosphere and reduce its flow towards the surface while the temperature inversion lasts.

East Antarctica has experienced slight cooling for decades while the rest of the world has warmed as the result of climate change. Clear warming over East Antarctica started has occurred at least since the year 2000 but was not conclusively detected until the 2020s. In the early 2000s, cooling over East Antarctica seemingly outweighed warming over the rest of the continent. It was frequently misinterpreted by the media and occasionally used as an argument for climate change denial.

After 2009, improvements in Antarctica's instrumental temperature record proved consistent warming over West Antarctica. Net warming has occurred across the continent since 1957. Because the East Antarctic ice sheet has warmed unevenly, it is still gaining ice on average. GRACE satellite data indicated East Antarctica mass gain of 60 ± 13 billion tons per year between 2002 and 2010. It will most likely see sustained losses of ice at its most vulnerable locations such as Totten Glacier and Wilkes Basin.

== Description ==
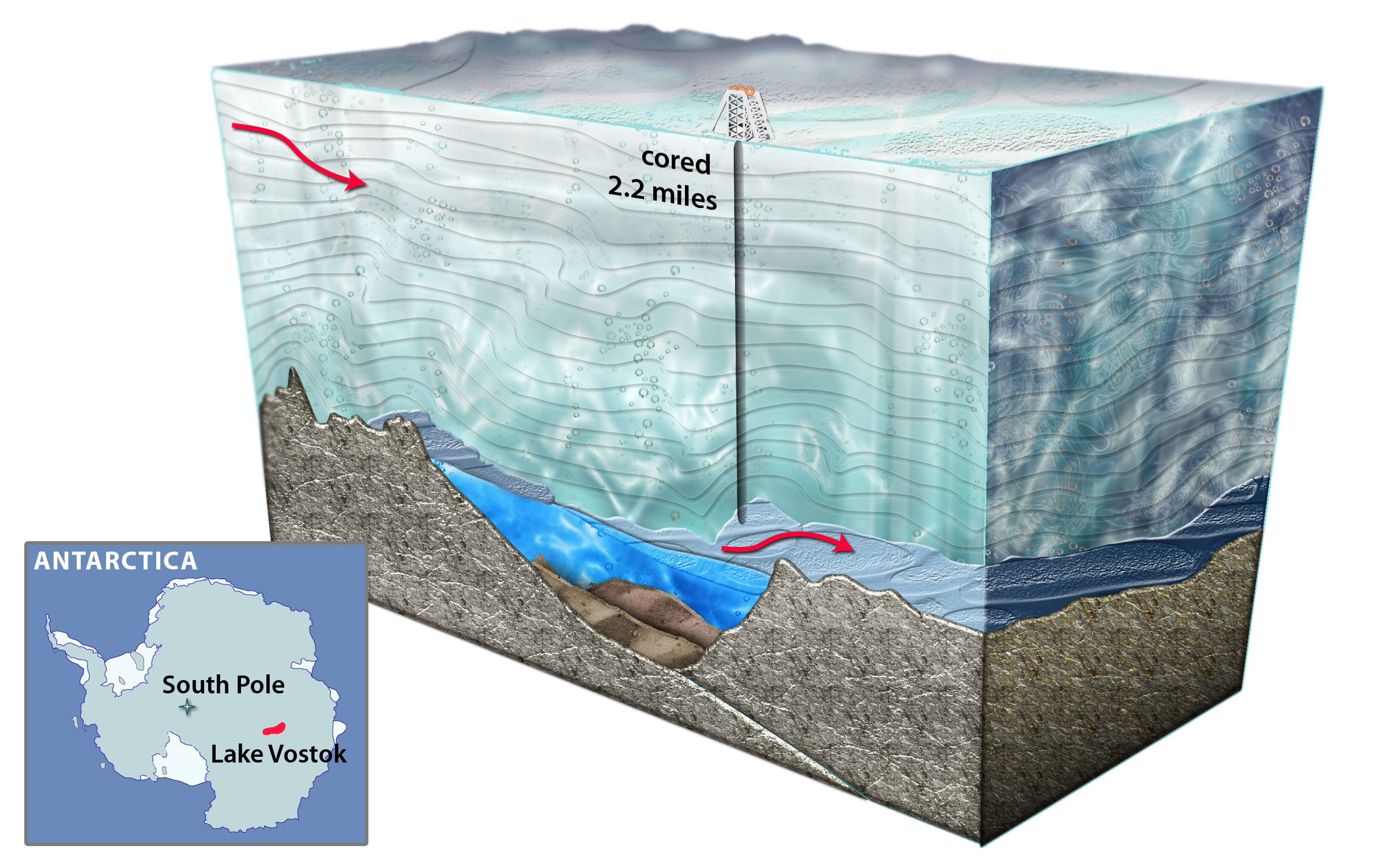
Location and diagram of Lake Vostok, a prominent subglacial lake beneath the East Antarctic Ice Sheet.

East Antarctic Ice Sheet is located directly above the East Antarctic Shield – a craton (stable area of the Earth's crust) with the area of 10,200,000 km^{2} (3,900,000 sq mi), which accounts for around 73% of the entire Antarctic landmass. East Antarctica is separate from West Antarctica due to the presence of Transantarctic Mountains, which span nearly 3,500 km (2,200 mi) from the Weddell Sea to the Ross Sea, and have a width of 100–300 km (62–186 mi).

In areas sometimes collectively described as East Antarctica's subglacial basins it is believed that once the warming reaches around 3 °C (5.4 °F) then collapse will occur over a period of around 2,000 years. This would ultimately add between 1.4 m (4 ft 7 in) and 6.4 m (21 ft 0 in) to sea levels, depending on the ice sheet model used. The EAIS as a whole holds enough ice to raise global sea levels by 53.3 m (175 ft). However, it would take global warming in a range between 5 °C (9.0 °F) and 10 °C (18 °F), and a minimum of 10,000 years for the entire ice sheet to be lost.

The ice sheet has an average thickness of around 2.2 km (1.4 mi). The thickest ice in Antarctica is located near Adélie Land close to the ice sheet's southeast coast, at the Astrolabe Subglacial Basin, where it measured 4,897 m (16,066 ft) around 2013. Much of the ice sheet is already located at a high elevation: in particular, Dome Argus Plateau has an average height of around 4 km (2.5 mi), and yet it is underlain by the Gamburtsev Mountain Range, which has the average height of 2.7 km (1.7 mi) and is about equivalent in size to the European Alps. Consequently, the ice thickness over these mountains ranges from around 1 km (0.62 mi) over their peaks to about 3 km (1.9 mi) over the valleys.

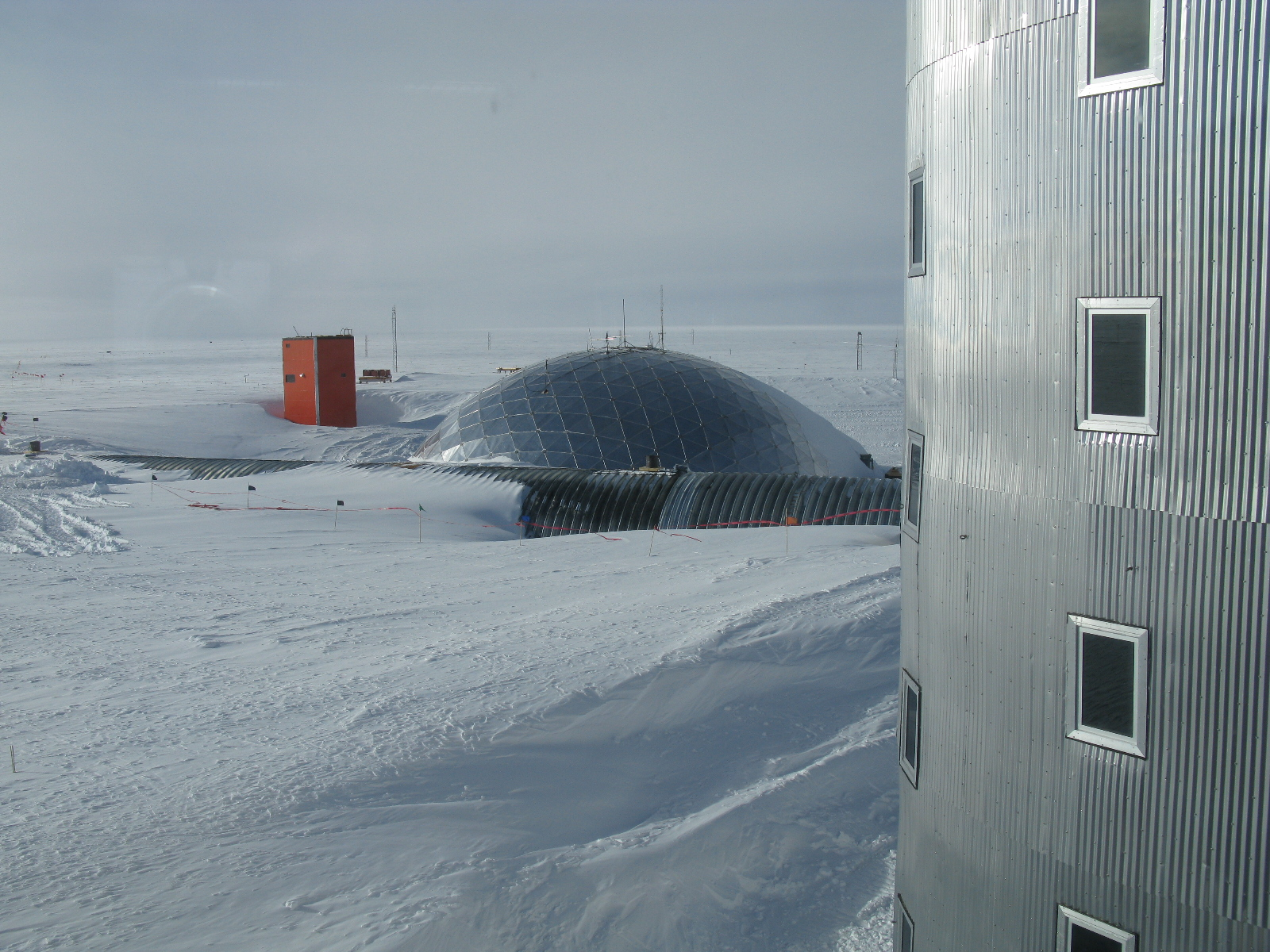
South Pole research station.

These high elevations are an important reason for why the ice sheet is the driest, windiest, and coldest place on Earth. Dome A in particular sets reported cold temperature records of nearly −100 °C (−148 °F). The only ice-free areas of East Antarctica are where there is too little annual precipitation to form an ice layer, which is the case in the so-called McMurdo Dry Valleys of the Southern Victoria Land. Another exception are the subglacial lakes, which occur so deep beneath the ice that the pressure melting point is well below 0 °C (32 °F).

Many countries have made territorial claims in Antarctica. Within EAIS, the United Kingdom, France, Norway, Australia, Chile and Argentina all claim a portion (sometimes overlapping) as their own territory.

== Geologic history ==
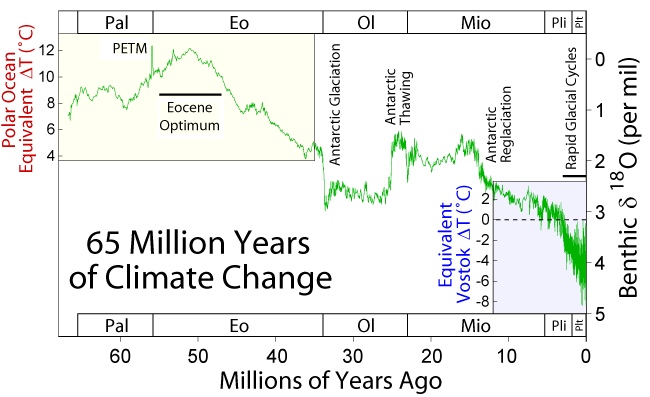
Polar climatic temperature changes throughout the Cenozoic, showing glaciation of Antarctica toward the end of the Eocene, thawing near the end of the Oligocene and subsequent Miocene re-glaciation.

While relatively small glaciers and ice caps are known to have been present in Antarctica since at least the time of Late Palaeocene, 60 million years ago, a proper ice sheet did not begin to form until the Eocene–Oligocene extinction event about 34 million years ago, when the atmospheric CO_{2} levels fell to below 750 parts per million. It was initially unstable, and did not grow to consistently cover the entire continent until 32.8 million years ago, when the CO_{2} levels had further declined to below 600 ppm.

Afterwards, the East Antarctic Ice Sheet declined substantially during the Middle Miocene Climatic Optimum 15 million years ago, yet started to recover about 13.96 million years ago. Since then, it had been largely stable, experiencing "minimal" change in its surface extent over the past 8 million years. While it had still thinned by at least 500 m (1,600 ft) during the Pleistocene period, and by less than 50 m (160 ft) since Last Glacial Maximum, the land area covered by ice in East Antarctica remained largely the same. Contrastingly, the smaller West Antarctic ice sheet is thought to have largely collapsed as recently as during the Eemian period, about 125,000 years ago.

== Recent climate change ==
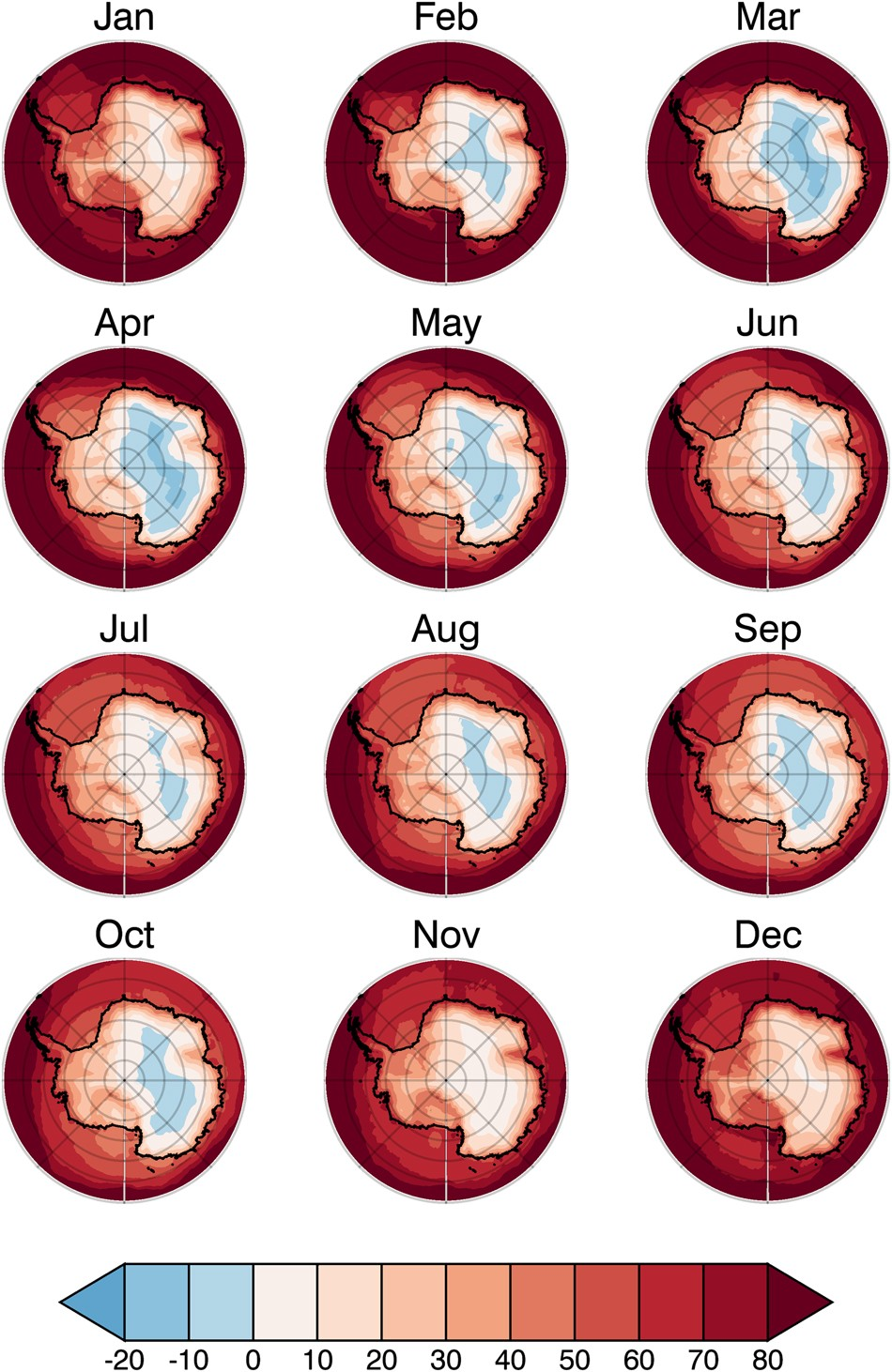
Parts of East Antarctica (marked in blue) are currently the only place on Earth to regularly experience negative greenhouse effect. At greater warming levels, this effect is likely to disappear due to increasing concentrations of water vapor over Antarctica

Antarctica as a whole has low sensitivity to climate change because it is surrounded by the Southern Ocean, which is more effective at absorbing heat than any other ocean due to the currents of the Southern Ocean overturning circulation, very low amounts of water vapor (which conducts heat through the atmosphere) and because of the high albedo (reflectivity) of its icy surface and of the surrounding sea ice. These factors make Antarctica the coldest continent, and East Antarctica is additionally cooler than the West Antarctica, because it is located at a substantially greater elevation. Thus, it is the only place on Earth cold enough for atmospheric temperature inversion to occur every winter. While the atmosphere on Earth is at its warmest near the surface and becomes cooler as elevation increases, temperature inversion during the Antarctic winter results in middle layers of the atmosphere being warmer than the surface.

This leads to the negative greenhouse effect on a local scale, where greenhouse gases trap heat in the middle atmosphere and reduce its flow towards the surface and towards space, while normally, they prevent the flow of heat from the lower atmosphere and towards space. This effect lasts until the end of the Antarctic winter. Consequently, East Antarctica had experienced cooling in the 1980s and 1990s, even as the rest of the Earth was warming. For instance, between 1986 and 2006 there had been a cooling of 0.7 °C (1.3 °F) per decade at Lake Hoare station in the McMurdo Dry Valleys. A 2002 paper by Peter Doran suggested that the cooling over East Antarctica outweighed warming of the rest of the continent. While the paper estimated that about 42% of the Antarctic area had been warming, it was wrongly described by many media outlets as a proof that there was no warming in Antarctica. In 2004, author Michael Crichton used that cooling as one of his arguments for denying climate change in his novel State of Fear. First other scientists, and then Peter Doran himself eventually had to debunk the book's claims.

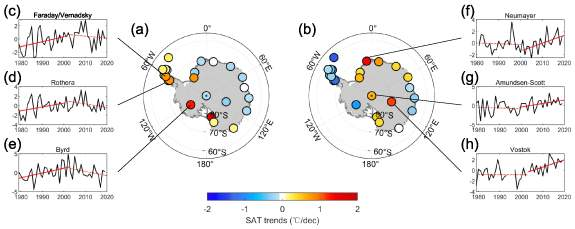
East Antarctica had demonstrated cooling in the 1980s and 1990s, even as the West Antarctica warmed (left-hand side). Changes in atmospheric patterns had reversed the trend in 2000s and 2010s (right-hand side)

In 2009, it was demonstrated that the West Antarctic Ice Sheet has warmed by more than 0.1 °C/decade since the 1950s, resulting in a statistically significant warming trend across Antarctica of >0.05 °C/decade since 1957. Later research found that after 2000, the warming of West Antarctica locations slowed or partially reversed between 2000 and 2020, while the East Antarctica interior had demonstrated clear warming. This happened due to the local changes in Southern Annular Mode the dominant climate variability pattern over the Antarctica. Some of those changes were caused by the ozone layer beginning to recover following the Montreal Protocol.

Aerial view of ice flows at Denman Glacier, one of the relatively few glaciers in the East Antarctica known to be losing mass.

The limited warming and already low temperatures over East Antarctica mean that as of early 2020s, the majority of observational evidence shows it continuing to gain mass. Some analyses have suggested it already began to lose mass in 2000s, but they over-extrapolated some observed losses onto the poorly-observed areas, and a more complete observational record shows continued mass gain. Because it is currently gaining mass, East Antarctic Ice Sheet is not expected to play a role in the 21st century sea level rise. However, it is still subject to adverse change, such as the retreat of Denman Glacier, or the flow of warmer ocean current into ice cavities beneath the stabilizing ice shelves like the Fimbulisen ice shelf in the Queen Maud Land.

== Long-term future ==
If countries cut greenhouse gas emissions significantly (lowest trace), then sea level rise by 2100 can be limited to 0.3–0.6 m (1–2 ft). If the emissions accelerate rapidly (top trace), sea levels could rise 5 m (16 1/2 ft) by 2300. This would involve ice loss from the EAIS.

If global warming were to reach higher levels, then the EAIS would play an increasingly larger role in sea level rise occurring after 2100. According to the most recent reports of the Intergovernmental Panel on Climate Change (SROCC and the IPCC Sixth Assessment Report), the most intense climate change scenario, where the anthropogenic emissions increase continuously, RCP8.5, would result in Antarctica alone losing a median of 1.46 m (4 ft 9 in) (confidence interval between 60 cm (2.0 ft) and 2.89 m (9 ft 6 in)) by 2300, which would involve some loss from the EAIS in addition to the erosion of the WAIS. This Antarctica-only sea level rise would be in addition to ice losses from the Greenland ice sheet and mountain glaciers, as well as the thermal expansion of ocean water. If the warming were to remain at elevated levels for a long time, then the East Antarctic Ice Sheet would eventually become the dominant contributor to sea level rise, simply because it contains the largest amount of ice.

Sustained ice loss from the EAIS would begin with the significant erosion of the so-called subglacial basins, such as Totten Glacier and Wilkes Basin, which are located in vulnerable locations below the sea level. Evidence from the Pleistocene shows that Wilkes Basin had likely lost enough ice to add 0.5 m (1 ft 8 in) to sea levels between 115,000 and 129,000 years ago, during the Eemian, and about 0.9 m (2 ft 11 in) between 318,000 and 339,000 years ago, during the Marine Isotope Stage 9. Neither Wilkes nor the other subglacial basins were lost entirely, but estimates suggest that they would be committed to disappearance once the global warming reaches 3 °C (5.4 °F) - the plausible temperature range is between 2 °C (3.6 °F) and 6 °C (11 °F). Then, the subglacial basins would gradually collapse over a period of around 2,000 years, although it may be as fast as 500 years or as slow as 10,000 years. Their loss would ultimately add between 1.4 m (4 ft 7 in) and 6.4 m (21 ft 0 in) to sea levels, depending on the ice sheet model used. Isostatic rebound of the newly ice-free land would also add 8 cm (3.1 in) and 57 cm (1 ft 10 in), respectively.

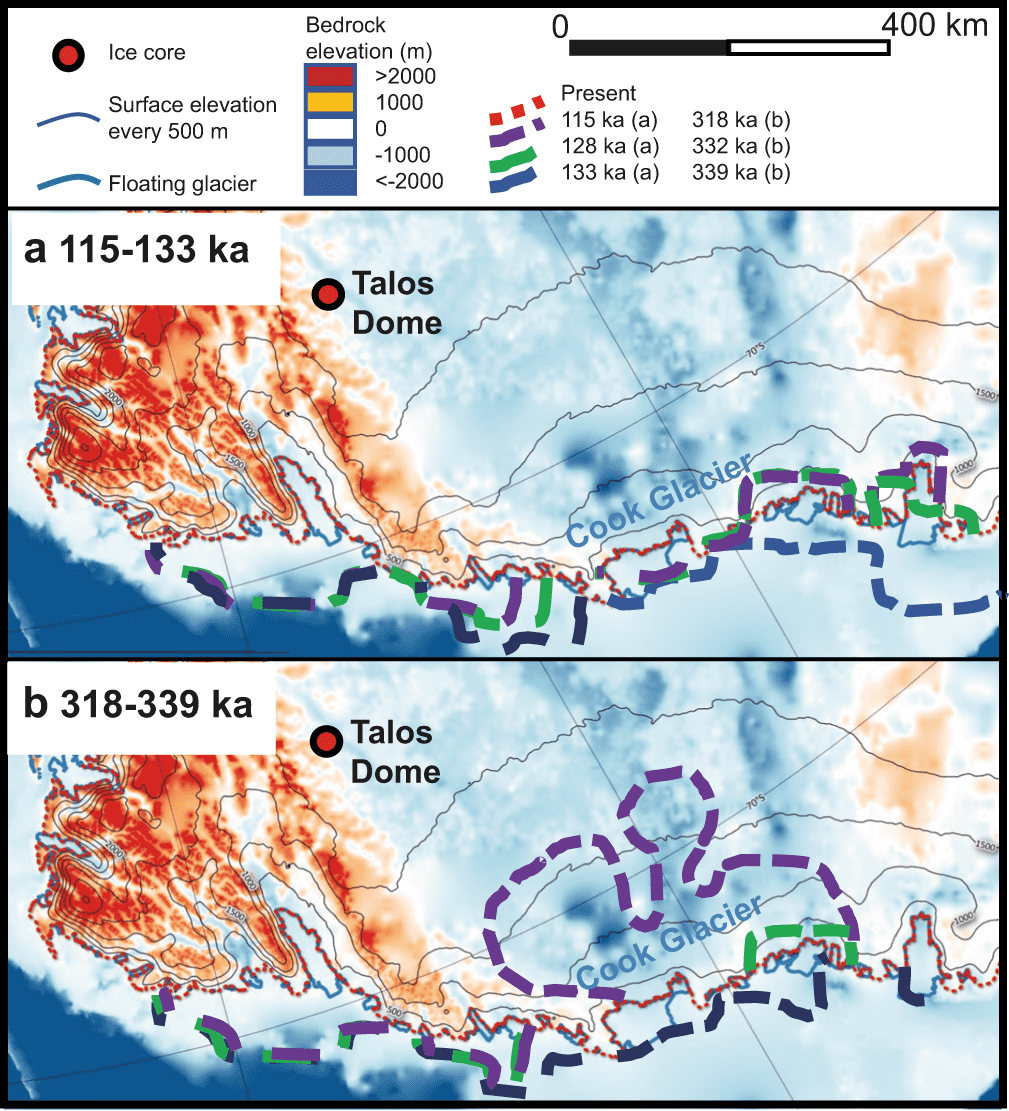
Retreat of Cook Glacier – a key part of the Wilkes Basin – during the Eemian ~120,000 years ago and an earlier Pleistocene interglacial ~330,000 years ago. These retreats would have added about 0.5 m (1 ft 8 in) and 0.9 m (2 ft 11 in) to sea level rise.

The entire East Antarctic Ice Sheet holds enough ice to raise global sea levels by 53.3 m (175 ft). Its complete melting is also possible, but it would require very high warming and a lot of time: In 2022, an extensive assessment of tipping points in the climate system published in Science Magazine concluded that the ice sheet would take a minimum of 10,000 years to fully melt. It would most likely be committed to complete disappearance only once the global warming reaches about 7.5 °C (13.5 °F), with the minimum and the maximum range between 5 °C (9.0 °F) and 10 °C (18 °F). Another estimate suggested that at least 6 °C (11 °F) would be needed to melt two thirds of its volume.

If the entire ice sheet were to disappear, then the change in ice-albedo feedback would increase the global temperature by 0.6 °C (1.1 °F), while the regional temperatures would increase by around 2 °C (3.6 °F). The loss of the subglacial basins alone would only add about 0.05 °C (0.090 °F) to global temperatures due to their relatively limited area, and a correspondingly low impact on global albedo.

== See also ==
- Cryosphere
- West Antarctic ice sheet
- Greenland ice sheet
- Climate change in Antarctica
