= Peacock Subglacial Trench =

Geographic feature in Antarctica

Peacock Subglacial Trench (76°30′S 124°0′E) is a subglacial trench that forms a north–south extension of Aurora Subglacial Basin in Wilkes Land. The trench lies south of Dome C and west of Belgica Subglacial Mountains. The feature was delineated by the Scott Polar Research Institute (SPRI)-National Science Foundation (NSF)-Technical University of Denmark (TUD) airborne radio echo sounding program, 1967–79, and named after the Peacock (Lieutenant William L. Hudson, USN) one of the ships of the United States Exploring Expedition, 1838-42 (Lieutenant Charles Wilkes, USN).
