= 2024 Antarctica heat wave =

Heat event caused by polar vortex weakening

Meteorological history
- Duration: July 2024
- Weakened polar vortex, El Niño, and climate change-induced Heat wave

Overall effects
- Areas affected: East Antarctica, Central Antarctica

The 2024 Antarctica heat wave refers to a prolonged and significant mid-winter increase in Antarctic temperatures compared to prior winters, causing several regions of Antarctica to reach temperatures 10 °C (18.0 °F) above normal in July 2024, up to a 28 °C (50.4 °F) increase above average. The heat wave was significant for occurring during the middle of the Antarctic winter when little to no sunlight shines on the continent, and temperatures are annually at their lowest historically.

== Background ==
In March 2024, a heat wave struck Antarctica that reached 39 °C (70.2 °F) above average. The increased heat led to a portion of an ice sheet that was roughly "the size of Rome" to fall apart into the Southern Ocean.

This heat wave lead to some regions of Antarctica facing temperatures that were up to 22 °C (39.6 °F) higher than normal and caused significantly reduced levels of sea ice, leading to extensive research on the event by a major global research project consisting of 54 members, who described the complexity of the heat wave's cause as "head-hurting".

== Meteorology ==
Models from climate researchers mapping the areas of the world indicated that the regions most impacted by anthropogenic climate change would be on Earth's poles in the Arctic and the Antarctic. Prior increases in temperatures in these regions have led to the collapse of Antarctic ice sheets that in turn significantly contribute to rising global sea levels.

Climate researchers found that a weakening in the Antarctic polar vortex, a "band of cold air and low pressure that spins in the stratosphere around each pole", was the primary cause of the heat wave. Atmospheric scientist Amy Butler reported that the weakening of the polar vortex was caused by atmospheric waves interfering with the vortex, meaning that higher altitude regions in the Antarctic were more susceptible to elevated temperatures. The disturbances in the polar vortex also caused "massive" quantities of freezing air to be pushed toward the equator, causing unseasonably colder temperatures and cold fronts throughout the Southern Hemisphere, including the Southern Cone of South America, New Zealand, and Australia. MetDesk director Michael Dukes noted that 2024's El Niño was a significant contributor to increased Antarctic temperatures in addition to anthropogenic climate change.

ETH Zürich climate researcher Jonathan Wille attributed the heatwave to a "really rare" several week long “southern stratospheric warming event” across the continent. University of Washington atmospheric scientist Edward Blanchard believed that warmer temperatures in the Southern Ocean and decreased sea ice around Antarctica further increased the susceptibility of Antarctica to warmer temperatures during its winter.

== Heat wave ==
In July 2024, a heat wave stuck most of Antarctica, primarily in the Eastern and Central regions of the continent. Average temperatures were at −4 °C (24.8 °F), extensively higher than average winter temperatures, especially for the time typically associated with Antarctica's coldest annual temperatures. As a result, the Southern Hemisphere Sea Ice Extent as plotted on a University of Maine Climate Reanalyzer graph reached its second lowest area having at least 15% ice cover on record for its respective day of the year, with only 2023 having a lower area that time of year. Extrapolation of the graph indicated that 2024 would soon surpass 2023 as the lowest ice cover recorded, potentially in August 2024. Decreased ice cover was reported to cause a feedback loop involving more sunlight absorbed in areas with less ice cover, further contributing to warming surface temperature and greater areas of melted ice.

Climate researchers predicted that average East Antarctic temperatures from 3 August to 13 August would persist at 36 to 50 degrees Fahrenheit above average, higher than temperatures in the last week of July 2024 that were 12 °C (21.6 °F) above average. The Amundsen–Scott South Pole Station recorded its warmest average July temperature since 2002 at 6.3 °C (11.3 °F) above average, with an average temperature of −47.6 °C (−53.7 °F) from 20 to 30 July, meeting the average February Antarctic temperature at the typical end of summer. Vostok, in the center of Antarctica's ice sheet, also recorded its warmest average July temperature since 2009, at 6.4 °C (11.5 °F) above average.

Forecasting director of MetDesk Michael Dukes stated that in addition to recordings of exceptionally high daily temperatures at several individual locations, there was a significantly prolonged rise in average temperatures throughout July 2024, which was more impactful towards the melting of ice. Berkeley Earth research scientist Zeke Hausfather stated that the Antarctic heat wave was a primary contributor to the hottest days of the planet in meteorological history recorded during July 2024. University of Washington atmospheric scientist Edward Blanchard called the heat wave a "near-record (or record) event".

== Reactions ==
Several prominent climate and meteorology researchers expressed feeling pronounced dread and worry over the heat wave. University of California, San Diego geophysicist Jamin Greenbaum shared his fear towards future Antarctic heat waves and their consequences in the next few years, after noting increasing melt each successive year in East Antarctica while conducting field expeditions. University of Michigan School for Environment and Sustainability climate scientist Jonathan Overpeck called the heat wave an “eye-opening sign" of how much anthropogenic climate change was impacting Earth.

== See also ==
- 2024 in climate change
- 2023 heat waves
- Climate change in Antarctica
- List of weather records
