= Peter Doran =

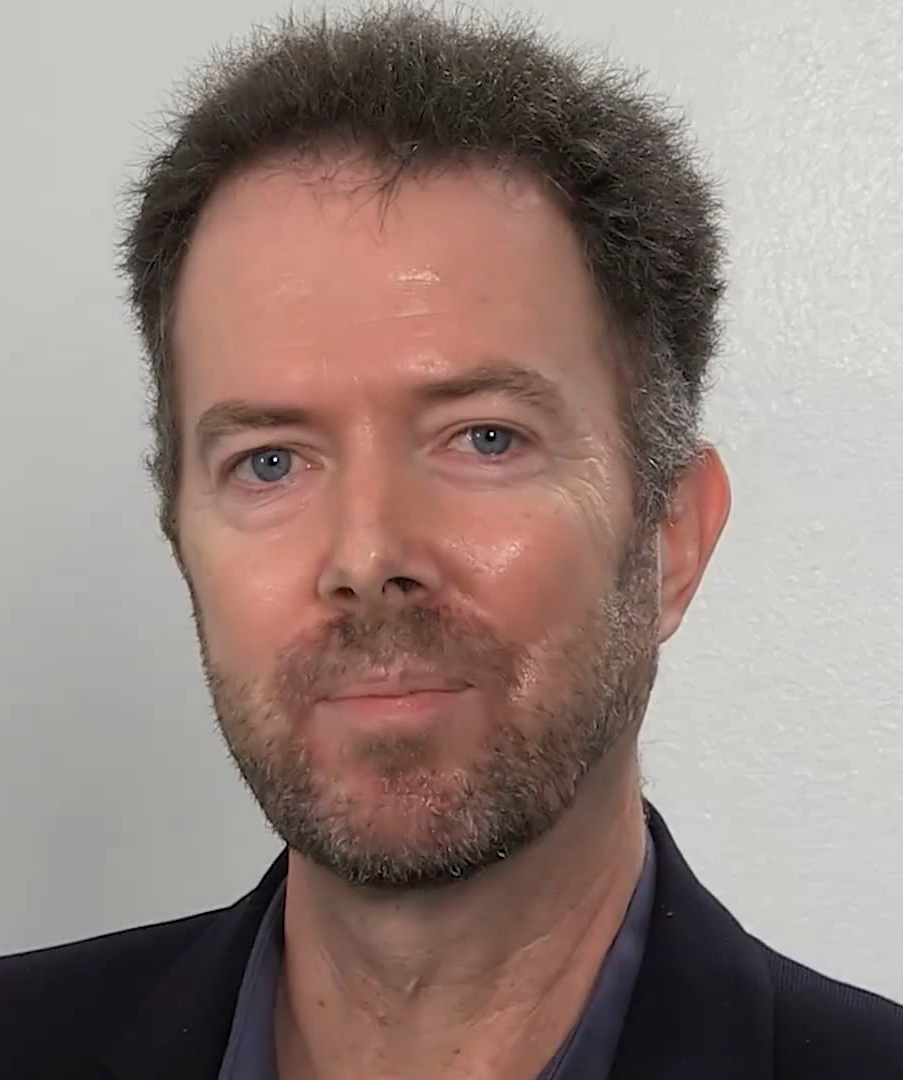
- Doran in 2015
- Born: June 28, 1960 (age 65)
- Scientific career
- Fields: Antarctic climate and ecosystems, astrobiology
- Institutions: Professor of Geology and Geophysics, Louisiana State University

Peter T. Doran is an American-Canadian Earth scientist who is Professor of Geology and Geophysics and John Franks Endowed Chair at Louisiana State University. Prior to 2015, he was faculty in Earth and Environmental Sciences at the University of Illinois at Chicago.

Doran specializes in polar regions, especially Antarctic climate and ecosystems. Doran was the lead author of a research paper about Antarctic temperatures that was published in the journal Nature in January 2002. Because he and his colleagues found that some parts of Antarctica had cooled between 1964 and 2000, his paper has been frequently cited by opponents of the global warming theory, such as Ann Coulter and Michael Crichton. In an opinion piece in the July 27, 2006 New York Times, Doran characterized this as a "misinterpretation" and stated, "I have never thought such a thing ... I would like to remove my name from the list of scientists who dispute global warming." (The temporary phenomenon is related to the "hole" in the ozone. As the "hole heals" the Antarctic will dramatically warm quickly.)

Doran and his graduate student Maggie Kendall Zimmerman also published a paper in the January 27, 2009 issue of Eos showing that active climate researchers almost unanimously agree (97.4%) that humans have had a significant impact on the Earth's climate. This was the first of three different studies by three different groups to establish this scientific consensus figure of 97 to 98% agreement, the others being Anderegg et al. (2010) and Cook et al. (2013).

Doran also applies his expertise in extreme polar environments to planetary science and has led and been a member of several NASA-funded projects using polar regions as analogs for Mars and icy/ocean worlds. He was nominated by former Apollo astronaut Harrison Schmidt to be a member of the Planetary Protection Subcommittee of the NASA Advisory Council in 2008 and served until 2017. In 2018 he was appointed to represent the U.S. as a member of the Committee on Space Research (COSPAR) Panel on Planetary Protection. In 2022 he was made Vice Chair of the Panel.

Both an Antarctic stream and glacier were named for Doran by the U.S. Geological Survey to commemorate his many significant research contributions conducted on the continent. Doran was elected as a Fellow of the Geological Society of America in 2018.

== Education ==
Doran did his undergraduate at Trent University in Peterborough Ontario, his Master of Science at Queen's University at Kingston, Ontario and moved to the U.S. in 1992 for a Ph.D. in Hydrology and Hydrogeology at the University of Nevada, Reno

== Personal life ==
Peter Doran was born and raised in Toronto, Canada. His father, Terence Doran, was a renowned gynecologist and obstetrician with a private practice and a faculty position at the University of Toronto, and was a pioneer of prenatal diagnosis.

== Most Cited Publications ==
McKnight, D.M., E.W. Boyer, P.K. Westerhoff, P.T. Doran, et al. 2001. Spectrofluorometric characterization of dissolved organic matter for indication of precursor organic material and aromaticity. Limnology and Oceanography 46 (1), 38–48.
Cook, J., N. Oreskes, P.T. Doran, W.R.L. Anderegg, B. Verheggen et al. 2016. Consensus on consensus: a synthesis of consensus estimates on human-caused global warming. Environmental Research Letters 11 (4), 048002 1502.
Doran, P.T. and M.K. Zimmerman. 2009. Examining the scientific consensus on climate change. Eos, Transactions American Geophysical Union 90 (3), 22–23.
Doran, P.T., J.C Priscu, W.B. Lyons, J.E. Walsh, A.G. Fountain, D.M, McKnight, et al. 2002. Antarctic climate cooling and terrestrial ecosystem response. Nature 415 (6871), 517–520.
