= Cape Mikhaylov =

Point in Wilkes Land, Antarctica

Cape Mikhaylov (66°54′S 118°32′E) is an ice-covered point about 42 nautical miles (78 km) east of Totten Glacier, Wilkes Land, Antarctica. It was photographed by U.S. Navy Operation Highjump in 1947, and plotted on base compilation maps by Gardner Blodgett of the Office of Geography, U.S. Department of the Interior, in 1955. The cape was photographed by the Soviet Antarctic Expedition in 1956, and was named after Pavel N. Mikhaylov, artist with the Bellingshausen expedition of 1819–1821.
