= Climate of Antarctica =

Surface temperature of Antarctica in winter and summer from the European Centre for Medium-Range Weather Forecasts

The climate of Antarctica is the coldest and driest on Earth. Antarctica averages 166 mm (6.5 in) of precipitation per year and snow rarely melts on most parts of the continent. After Antarctic snow becomes compressed, it becomes the glacier ice that makes up the ice sheet. Weather fronts rarely penetrate far into the continent, because of the katabatic winds. Most of Antarctica has an ice-cap climate (Köppen classification EF) with very cold and dry weather.

== Temperature ==
The Antarctic temperature changes during the last several glacial and interglacial cycles of the present ice age

Temperatures in the Antarctic region vary with latitude, elevation, and distance from the ocean. East Antarctica is colder than West Antarctica, partly due to its higher elevation, while the Antarctic Peninsula has the most moderate climate.

The highest temperatures occur in January along the coast, averaging slightly below freezing. The highest temperature ever recorded in the Antarctic region was 19.8 °C (67.6 °F) recorded at Signy Research Station, Signy Island on 30 January 1982, while the highest temperature on the continent of Antarctica was 18.3 °C (64.9 °F) at Esperanza Base on 6 February 2020.

The lowest measured air temperature on Antarctica was set on 21 July 1983, when a temperature of −89.2 °C (−128.6 °F) was observed at Vostok Station at an elevation of 3,488 meters (11,444 feet). For comparison, this is 10.7 °C (19.3 °F) colder than subliming dry ice at standard temperature and pressure.

Satellite measurements have identified even lower ground temperatures, with −93.2 °C (−135.8 °F) having been observed at the cloud-free Antarctic Plateau on 10 August 2010. The lowest recorded temperature of any location on Earth's surface at 81.8°S 63.5°E was revised with new data in 2018 in nearly 100 locations, ranging from −93.2 °C (−135.8 °F) to −98 °C (−144.4 °F). This unnamed part of the Antarctic Plateau, between Dome A and Dome F, was measured on 10 August 2010, and the temperature was deduced from radiance measured by Landsat 8 and other satellites. It was discovered during a National Snow and Ice Data Center review of stored data in December 2013 but revised by researchers on 25 June 2018. This temperature is not directly comparable to the −89.2 °C (−128.6 °F) reading quoted above, since it was deduced from satellite-measured upwelling radiance, rather than an air temperature measured by athermometer at precisely 1.5 m (5 ft) above the ground surface.

The mean annual temperature of the interior of the continent is −43.5 °C (−46.3 °F). The coast is warmer; on the coast Antarctic average temperatures are around −10 °C (14.0 °F) (in the warmest parts of Antarctica) and in the elevated inland they average about −55 °C (−67.0 °F) in Vostok. Monthly means at McMurdo Station range from −26 °C (−14.8 °F) in August to −3 °C (26.6 °F) in January. At the South Pole, the highest temperature ever recorded was −12.3 °C (9.9 °F) on 25 December 2011.

== Precipitation ==
Map of average annual precipitation on Antarctica (mm liquid equivalent)

The total precipitation on Antarctica, averaged over the entire continent, is about 166 millimetres (6.5 inches) per year (Vaughan et al., J. Clim., 1999). The actual rates vary widely, from high values over the Peninsula (380 to 640 millimetres (15 to 25 inches) a year) to very low values (as little as 50 millimetres (2.0 inches) in the high interior (Bromwich, Reviews of Geophysics, 1988)). Areas that receive less than 250 millimetres (9.8 inches) of precipitation per year are classified as deserts. Almost all Antarctic precipitation falls as snow. Rainfall is rare and mainly occurs during the summer in coastal areas and surrounding islands. Note that the quoted precipitation is a measure of its equivalence to water, rather than being the actual depth of snow. The air in Antarctica is also very dry. The low temperatures result in a very low absolute humidity, which means that dry skin and cracked lips are a continual problem for scientists and expeditioners working on the continent.

== Weather condition classification ==
The weather in Antarctica can be highly variable, and the weather conditions can often change dramatically in short periods of time. There are various classifications for describing weather conditions in Antarctica; restrictions given to workers during the different conditions vary by station and nation.

== Ice cover ==
Nearly all of Antarctica is covered by a sheet of ice that is, on average, at least 1,500 m (5,000 ft) thick. Antarctica contains 90% of the world's ice and more than 70% of its fresh water. If all the land-ice covering Antarctica were to melt—around 30×10^{6} km^{3} (7.2×10^{6} cu mi) of ice—the seas would rise by over 60 m (200 ft). The Antarctic is so cold that even with increases of a few degrees, temperatures would generally remain below the melting point of ice. Higher temperatures are expected to lead to more precipitation, which takes the form of snow. This would increase the amount of ice in Antarctica, offsetting approximately one third of the expected sea level rise from thermal expansion of the oceans. During the period from January 1992 to January 2003, East Antarctica thickened at an average rate of about 1.8 cm (11/16 in) per year while West Antarctica showed an overall thinning of 0.9 cm (3/8 in) per year. For the contribution of Antarctica to present and future sea level change, see sea level rise. Because ice flows, albeit slowly, the ice within the ice sheet is younger than the age of the sheet itself.

Morphometric data for Antarctica (from Drewry, 1983)
Surface	Area		Mean ice thickness (m)	Volume	
Surface	(km^{2})	Percent	Mean ice thickness (m)	(km^{3})	Percent
Inland ice sheet	11,965,700	85.97	2,450	29,324,700	97.39
Ice shelves	1,541,710	11.08	475	731,900	2.43
Ice rises	78,970	0.57	670	53,100	0.18
Glacier ice (total)	13,586,380		2,160	30,109,800 (Note: The total ice volume is different from the sum of the component parts because individual figures have been rounded.)	
Rock outcrop	331,690	2.38			
Antarctica (total)	13,918,070	100.00	2,160	30,109,800	100.00

Regional ice data (from Drewry and others, 1982; Drewry, 1983)
Region	Area (km^{2})	Mean ice thickness (m)	Volume (km^{3})
East Antarctica
Inland ice	9,855,570	2,630	25,920,100
Ice shelves	293,510	400	117,400
Ice rises	4,090	400	1,600
West Antarctica (excluding Antarctic Peninsula)
Inland ice sheet	1,809,760	1,780	3,221,400
Ice shelves	104,860	375	39,300
Ice rises	3,550	375	1,300
Antarctic Peninsula
Inland ice sheet	300,380	610	183,200
Ice shelves	144,750	300	43,400
Ice rises	1,570	300	500
Ross Ice Shelf
Ice shelf	525,840	427	224,500
Ice rises	10,320	500	5,100
Filchner-Ronne Ice Shelf
Ice shelf	472,760	650	307,300
Ice rises	59,440	750	44,600

=== Ice shelves ===
Antarctic ice shelves, 1998

About 75% of the coastline of Antarctica is ice shelf. The majority of ice shelf consists of floating ice, and a lesser amount consists of glaciers that move slowly from the land mass into the sea. Ice shelves lose mass through breakup of glacial ice (calving), or basal melting due to warm ocean water under the ice.

Melting or breakup of floating shelf ice does not directly affect global sea levels; however, ice shelves have a buttressing effect on the ice flow behind them. If ice shelves break up, the ice flow behind them may accelerate, resulting in increasing melt of the Antarctic ice sheet and an increasing contribution to sea level rise.

Known changes in coastline ice around the Antarctic Peninsula:

- 1936–1989: Wordie Ice Shelf significantly reduced in size.
- 1995: Ice in the Prince Gustav Channel disintegrated.
- Parts of the Larsen Ice Shelf broke up in recent decades.
  - 1995: The Larsen A ice shelf disintegrated in January 1995.
  - 2001: 3,250 km^{2} (1,250 sq mi) of the Larsen B ice shelf disintegrated in February 2001. It had been gradually retreating before the breakup event.
  - 2015: A study concluded that the remaining Larsen B ice-shelf will disintegrate by the end of the decade, based on observations of faster flow and rapid thinning of glaciers in the area.

The George VI Ice Shelf, which may be on the brink of instability, has probably existed for approximately 8,000 years, after melting 1,500 years earlier. Warm ocean currents may have been the cause of the melting. Not only are the ice sheets losing mass, they are losing mass at an accelerating rate.

== Climate change ==
Despite its isolation, Antarctica has experienced warming and ice loss in recent decades, driven by greenhouse gas emissions. West Antarctica warmed by over 0.1 °C per decade from the 1950s to the 2000s, and the exposed Antarctic Peninsula has warmed by 3 °C (5.4 °F) since the mid-20th century. The colder, stabler East Antarctica did not show any warming until the 2000s. Around Antarctica, the Southern Ocean has absorbed more oceanic heat than any other ocean, and has seen strong warming at depths below 2,000 m (6,600 ft). Around the West Antarctic, the ocean has warmed by 1 °C (1.8 °F) since 1955.

The warming of the Southern Ocean around Antarctica has caused the weakening or collapse of ice shelves, which float just offshore of glaciers and stabilize them. Many coastal glaciers have been losing mass and retreating, causing net ice loss across Antarctica although the East Antarctic ice sheet continues to gain ice inland. By 2100, net ice loss from Antarctica is expected to add about 11 cm (5 in) to global sea level rise. Marine ice sheet instability may cause West Antarctica to contribute tens of centimeters more if it is triggered before 2100. With higher warming, instability would be much more likely and could double the 21st-century global sea level rise.

== See also ==
- Antarctic oscillation
- Antarctica cooling controversy
- Climate of the Arctic
- Effects of global warming
- Polar amplification
- Retreat of glaciers since 1850
- Southern Ocean
