= Adventure Subglacial Trench =

Geographic area in Antarctica

Coordinates: 74°0′S 132°0′E

Geography
- Location: Wilkes Land, Antarctica
- Interactive map of Adventure Subglacial Trench

Adventure Subglacial Trench is a subglacial valley in the interior of Wilkes Land, running north–south and joined by Vincennes Subglacial Basin to Aurora Subglacial Basin to the west. The feature was delineated by the SPRI-NSF-TUD airborne radio echo sounding program, 1967–79, and named after HMS Adventure (Commander Tobias Furneaux, Royal Navy), one of the two ships of the British expedition, 1772–75 (Captain James Cook, Royal Navy).
