= Totten Glacier =

Glacier in Antarctica

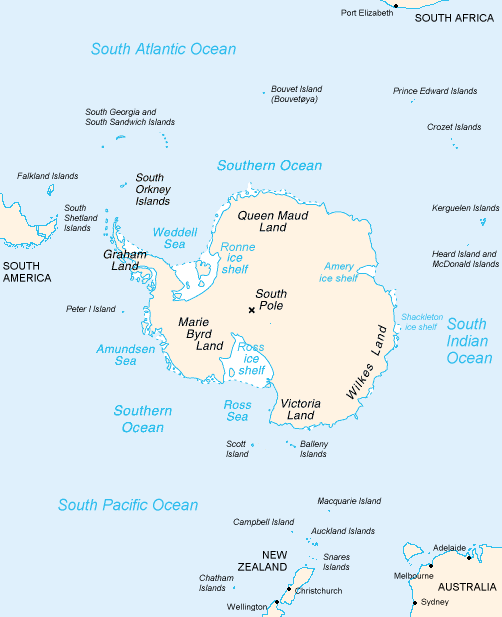
- Map of Antarctica, with Wilkes Land slightly to the right

- Location within Antarctica
- Location: Wilkes Land
- Coordinates: 67°00′00″S 116°20′00″E

Totten Glacier is a large glacier draining a major portion of the East Antarctic Ice Sheet, through the Budd Coast of Wilkes Land in the Australian Antarctic Territory. The catchment drained by the glacier is estimated at 538,000 km^{2} (208,000 sq mi), extending approximately 1,100 km (680 mi) into the interior and holds the potential to raise sea level by at least 3.5 m (11 ft). Totten drains northeastward from the continental ice but turns northwestward at the coast where it terminates in a prominent tongue close east of Cape Waldron. It was first delineated from aerial photographs taken by USN Operation Highjump (1946–47), and named by Advisory Committee on Antarctic Names (US-ACAN) for George M. Totten, midshipman on USS Vincennes of the United States Exploring Expedition (1838–42), who assisted Lieutenant Charles Wilkes with correction of the survey data obtained by the expedition.

Totten Ice Shelf is a 6,200 km^{2} (2,400 sq mi) floating portion of Totten Glacier, laterally bounded by the Aurora Subglacial Basin to the south and Law Dome to the north. The ice shelf exists at the confluence of the two main grounded tributaries of Totten Glacier, its base lies 2,500 m (8,200 ft) below sea level near the grounding line of the western tributary, and the ice shelf surface is characterized by longitudinal channels and transverse fractures. Totten Ice Shelf is of glaciological interest because it buttresses the flow of grounded ice while coupling the ice basin to ocean processes such as ocean warming.

Totten Glacier Tongue (66°35′S 116°5′E) is a small glacier tongue extending seaward from Totten Glacier. Delineated from air photos taken by U.S. Navy Operation Highjump (1946–47) and named by US-ACAN in association with Totten Glacier.

== Melt ==
Totten Glacier drains the Aurora Subglacial Basin, which is largely grounded below sea level and is subject to marine ice sheet instability, meaning melt near the grounding line could lead to runaway glacier retreat and a significant contribution to sea level rise.

Surface altimetry measurements from Interferometric synthetic-aperture radar suggest that Totten Glacier lost mass from 1992 to 2006 and gravity measurements obtained by the Gravity Recovery and Climate Experiment satellite indicate mass loss has continued through at least 2016. The ICESat laser altimeter measured surface lowering of the grounded and floating portions of Totten Glacier from 2003 to 2009; however, longer term observations of the floating ice shelf show interannual variability of thickness and velocity.

Totten Glacier loses mass primarily through melt at its ice shelf base, and melt is influenced by the availability of ocean heat entering the cavity below the ice shelf. Warm, modified Circumpolar deep water enters the Totten Ice Shelf cavity through submarine canyons, driven by wind processes at the nearby continental shelf break. Wind processes and sea ice formation along the Sabrina Coast have been linked to variability in Totten Ice Shelf basal melt and calving rates.

A study in 2019 (published 2023) at the outfall of the Totten Glacier in East Antarctica showed that water at depth, above freezing temperature, was melting the under-side of the glacier.

== See also ==
- Cape Mikhaylov
- Ice stream
- List of glaciers in the Antarctic
- List of Antarctic ice streams
- Retreat of glaciers since 1850
