= Wilkes Basin =

Coordinates: 75°0′S 145°0′E

The Wilkes Basin is a large subglacial basin situated generally southward of George V Coast and westward of Prince Albert Mountains in East Antarctica. The feature is approximately 1400 km long and 400 km wide. The Wilkes Basin is considered to be the largest marine-based drainage basin in East Antarctica, and may be in a state of marine ice sheet instability, caused by warm water intrusion into the shelf cavities.

== History ==
It was discovered by the United States Victoria Land Traverse of 1959–1960. It was named by the Advisory Committee on Antarctic Names (US-ACAN) (1961) for the proximity of the western portion of this feature to Wilkes Land, and for the explorations along George V Coast by the United States Exploring Expedition (1838–42) under Lieutenant Charles Wilkes, USN.

== Deglaciation ==
A study reported in Nature Climate Change on May 5, 2014 says the marine ice trapped in the basin is at risk of melting over the next 200 years. If unstopped, the East Antarctica ice would then move out into the sea over the next 5,000 to 10,000 years and could raise sea levels worldwide by three to four metres over that span of time. The Intergovernmental Panel on Climate Change (IPCC) reported (with low confidence) in its Sixth Assessment Report that under warming of 3 °C to 5 °C, the most extreme of three warming scenarios reported, substantial parts or all of Wilkes Subglacial Basin in East Antarctica could melt over several millennia. In 2022, it was included in an extensive assessment of tipping points in the climate system published in Science, where it was grouped alongside several other subglacial basins like the nearby Aurora Basin. It concluded that their collective tipping threshold lies around 3 °C, with a range between 2 °C and 6 °C. Their collapse would then take between 500 and 10,000 years (with a median of 2000 years). The associated change in ice–albedo feedback would be expected to raise the global temperature by an additional 0.05 °C.

== See also ==
- Amundsen Basin
- Resolution Subglacial Highlands
