= Aurora Subglacial Basin =

Geographic area in Antarctica

Coordinates: 74°S 114°E

Aurora Subglacial Basin is a large subglacial basin of Wilkes Land to the west of Dome Charlie and trending northwest toward the coast in the vicinity of Shackleton Ice Shelf. The basin was delineated by the SPRI-NSF-TUD airborne radio echo sounding program, 1967–79, and named after Aurora, the ship of the Australasian Antarctic Expedition, 1911–14, led by Douglas Mawson.

The Aurora Subglacial Basin is largely grounded below sea level, making it susceptible to marine ice sheet instability. The Aurora Subglacial Basin is drained in part by Totten Glacier, which responds readily to melt induced by upwelling of warm circumpolar deep water and could raise global sea level by more than 3.5 m. In 2011, ice-penetrating radar led to the creation of the first high-resolution topographic map of the Basin, one of the last uncharted regions of Earth. The map reveals some of the largest fjords or ice cut channels on Earth, down to more than two kilometres below sea level.
