= Andrews =

Andrews may refer to:

== Places ==
=== Australia ===
- Andrews, Queensland
- Andrews, South Australia

=== United States ===
- Andrews, Florida (disambiguation), various places
- Andrews, Indiana
- Andrews, Nebraska
- Andrews, North Carolina
- Andrews, Oregon
- Andrews, South Carolina
- Andrews, Texas
- Andrews County, Texas
- Andrews Air Force Base near Washington, D.C., home of Air Force One
- Andrews University (Michigan)

=== Philippines ===
- Andrews Avenue, a major thoroughfare in Metro Manila, Philippines

== Other ==
- Andrews (surname)
- Andrews v Law Society of British Columbia, a 1989 Supreme Court of Canada case on constitutional equality guarantees
- Joseph Andrews, a novel by Henry Fielding
- An Apology for the Life of Mrs. Shamela Andrews, a parody novel
- Andrews, a bus company in Sheffield, South Yorkshire, England, that merged with Yorkshire Traction
- Andrews Osborne Academy, a private school in Willoughby, Ohio
- Henry Cranke Andrews (fl. 1794 – 1830), English botanist (standard author abbreviation Andrews)

== See also ==
- Andrewsville, Ontario, Canada
- Justice Andrews (disambiguation)
- St Andrews (disambiguation)
- Andrews Peak (disambiguation)
