= Allegheny Mountains (Antarctica) =

Group of mountains in Marie Byrd Land, Antarctica

- Location within Antarctica

Geography
- Continent: Antarctica
- Area: Marie Byrd Land
- Range coordinates: 77°15′S 143°18′W
- Parent range: Ford Ranges

The Allegheny Mountains (77°15′S 143°18′W) are a small group of mountains 10 nautical miles (19 km; 12 mi) west of the Clark Mountains in the Ford Ranges of Marie Byrd Land, Antarctica.

== Location ==
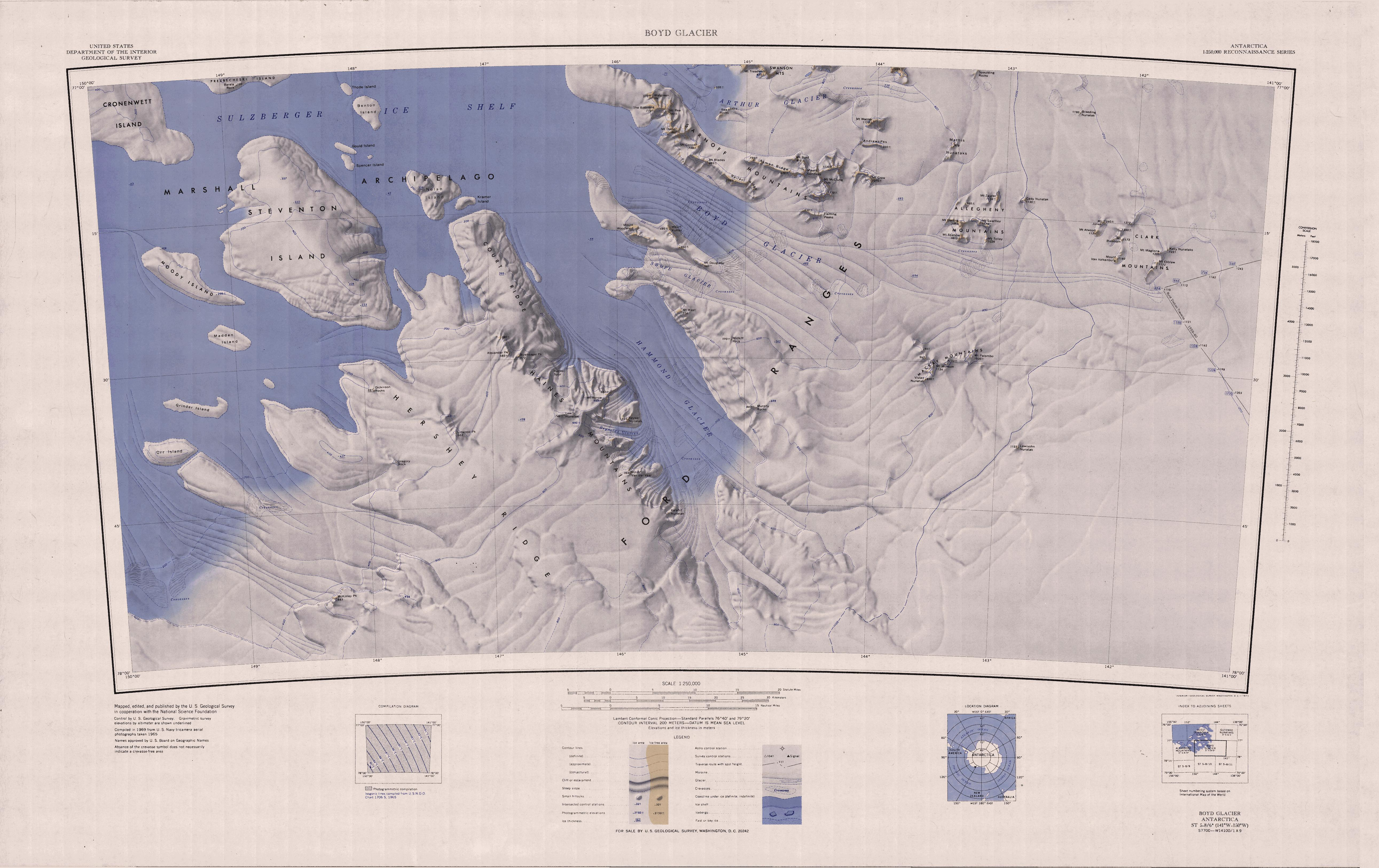
Allegheny Mountains towards the northeast of map

The Allegheny Mountains are north of the upper Boyd Glacier and the Mackay Mountains, east of the Sarnoff Mountains and west of the Clark Mountains. Features, from west to east, include Mount Darling, Mount Spencer, Mount Tolley, Mount Swartley, Mount Zeigler and Cady Nunatak. Isolated features to the north and east include the Mathis Nunataks, Spaulding Rocks and Breeding Nunatak.

== Discovery and name ==
The Allegheny Mountains were discovered on aerial exploration flights in 1934 by the Byrd Antarctic Expedition (ByrdAE) and subsequently mapped from aerial flights and ground surveys by the United States Antarctic Service (USAS) from 1939 to 1941. They were named by the USAS for Allegheny College, Meadville, Pennsylvania which is the alma mater of Paul Siple, leader of the United States Antarctic Service West Base.

== Features ==
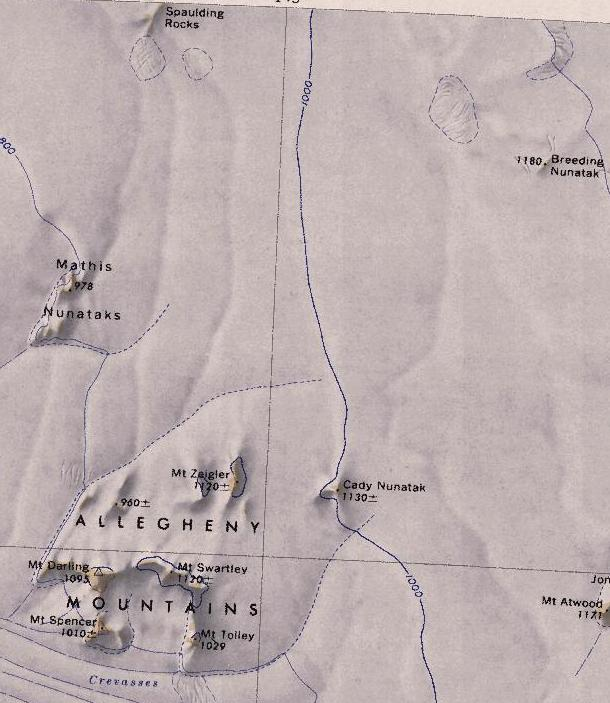
Map detail showing the mountains and nearby features

=== Mount Darling ===
77°15′S 143°20′W. The highest peak of the Allegheny Mountains, standing 1 nautical mile (1.9 km; 1.2 mi) west of Mount Swartley. Discovered on aerial flights from the West Base of USAS in 1940. Named for Professor Chester A. Darling of Allegheny College.

=== Mount Spencer ===
77°17′S 143°20′W. A peak 1 nautical mile (1.9 km; 1.2 mi) south of Mount Darling. Discovered on aerial flights from West Base of the USAS (1939–41). Named for Herbert R. Spencer of Erie, Pennsylvania, the Sea Scout commander of Paul Siple, leader of the West Base party of that expedition.

=== Mount Tolley ===
77°17′S 143°07′W. A peak, 1,030 metres (3,380 ft) high, standing 2 nautical miles (3.7 km; 2.3 mi) south of Mount Swartley. Discovered on aerial flights from West Base of the USAS (1939–41). Named for president William P. Tolley of Allegheny College.

=== Mount Swartley ===
77°15′S 143°12′W. A peak 1 nautical mile (1.9 km; 1.2 mi) east of Mount Darling. Discovered on aerial flights from West Base of the USAS (1939–41). Named for Professor Stanley Swartley of Allegheny College.

=== Mount Zeigler ===
77°13′S 143°03′W. A mountain 1,120 metres (3,670 ft) high 3 nautical miles (5.6 km; 3.5 mi) north-northeast of Mount Swartley. Mapped by USAS (1939–41) and by the United States Geological Survey (USGS) from surveys and United States Navy air photos (1959–65). Named by the United States Advisory Committee on Antarctic Names (US-ACAN) for Lieutenant Commander Luther L. Zeigler, United States Navy, pilot on LC-130F Hercules aircraft flights during Operation Deep Freeze 1968.

=== Cady Nunatak ===
77°13′S 142°51′W. A nunatak 3 nautical miles (5.6 km; 3.5 mi) east of Mount Zeigler in the northeast part of the Allegheny Mountains. Mapped by USGS from surveys and United States Navy air photos, 1959-65. Named by US-ACAN for Frederick M. Cady, United States Antarctic Research Program (USARP) ionospheric physicist at Byrd Station, 1968.

== Nearby features ==
=== Mathis Nunataks ===
77°08′S 143°27′W. An isolated cluster of nunataks near the head of Arthur Glacier, 8 nautical miles (15 km; 9.2 mi) east-southeast of Mount Warner. Mapped by USAS (1939–41) and by USGS from surveys and United States Navy air photos (1959–65). Named by US-ACAN for Terry R. Mathis, traverse engineer with the Byrd Station glaciological strain network, summer season (1967–68), and station engineer with the Byrd Station winter party (1968).

=== Spaulding Rocks ===
77°00′S 143°16′W. A somewhat isolated group of rocks lying 11 nautical miles (20 km; 13 mi) northeast of Mount Warner. Mapped by USAS (1939–41) and by USGS from surveys and United States Navy air photos (1959–65). Named by US-ACAN for Howard R. Spauiding, United States Navy, builder at Byrd Station in 1966.

=== Breeding Nunatak ===
77°04′S 142°28′W. An isolated nunatak 10 nautical miles (19 km; 12 mi) northeast of the Allegheny Mountains. Mapped by USGS from surveys and United States Navy air photos, 1959-65. Named by US-ACAN for George H. Breeding, storekeeper, United States Navy, of Byrd Station, 1967.

== Sources ==
- Alberts, Fred G., ed. (1995), Geographic Names of the Antarctic (PDF) (2 ed.), United States Board on Geographic Names This article incorporates public domain material from websites or documents of the United States Board on Geographic Names.
- Boyd Glacier, USGS: United States Geological Survey
- This article incorporates public domain material from websites or documents of the United States Geological Survey.
