= Murphy Rocks =

Murphy Rocks may refer to:

- Murphy Rocks, Australian Antarctic Territory
- Murphy Rocks (Marie Byrd Land)
