= Mackay Mountains =

Mountain group in Marie Byrd Land, Antarctica

- Location within Antarctica

Highest point
- Elevation: 960 m (3,150 ft)

Geography
- Continent: Antarctica
- Area: Marie Byrd Land
- Range coordinates: 77°30′S 143°20′W
- Parent range: Ford Ranges

The Mackay Mountains (77°30′S 143°20′W) are a prominent group of peaks 10 nautical miles (19 km; 12 mi) south of the Allegheny Mountains in the Ford Ranges of Marie Byrd Land, Antarctica.

== Location ==
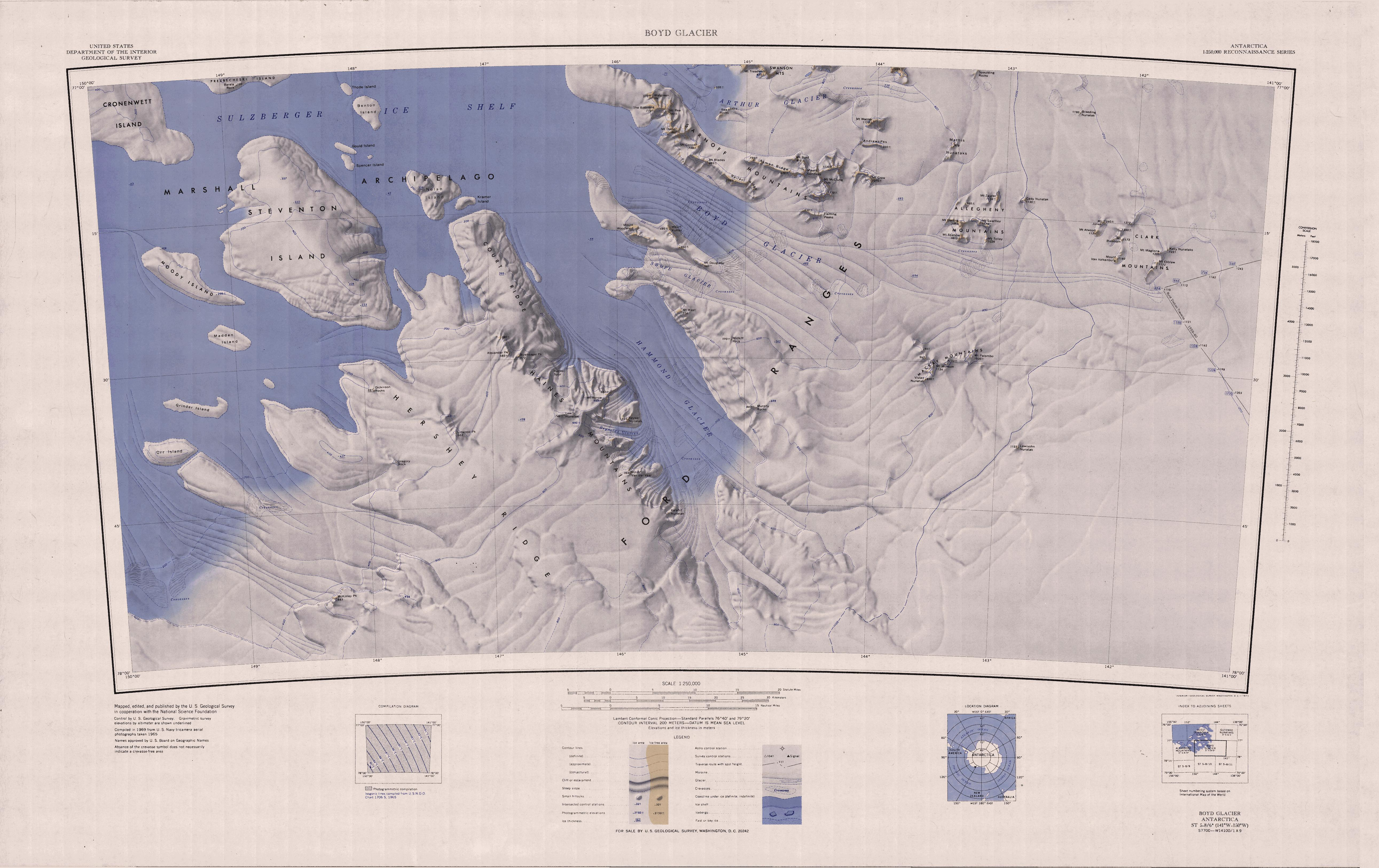
Mackay Mountains in center of the eastern half of the map.

The Mackay Mountains are south of the upper Boyd Glacier and east of the Hammond Glacier. They are southeast of the Sarnoff Mountains, south of the Allegheny Mountains and southwest of the Clark Mountains. The isolated Lewisohn Nunatak is to the southeast. Features, from west to east, include Vivian Nunatak, Mount Monson and Mount Palombo.

== Geology ==
The Mackay Mountains and Lewisohn Nunatak contain the Lewisohn Member, a volcano-dominated unit of the Swanson Formation, which is a quartzose metaflysch sequence at least 1 kilometre (0.62 mi) thick that was probably deposited on a submarine fan. In Mackay Mountains the isochron age for the metamorphism of the Swanson Formation is 444 ± 4Ma.

== Discovery and name ==
The Mackay Mountains were discovered by the Byrd Antarctic Expedition (ByrdAE) in 1934. They were named for Clarence Mackay of the Postal Telegraph and Mackay Radio Companies, a benefactor of the expedition.

== Features ==
Features and nearby features include:

=== Vivian Nunatak ===
77°32′S 143°34′W. A nunatak which marks the southwest extremity of the Mackay Mountains. Mapped by the United States Antarctic Service (USAS; 1939–41) and by the United States Geological Survey (USGS) from surveys and United States Navy air photos (1959-65). Named by the United States Advisory Committee on Antarctic Names (US-ACAN) for Lieutenant John F. Vivian, United States Navy Reserve, co-pilot of LC-130F Hercules aircraft during Operation Deep Freeze 1968.

=== Mount Monson ===
77°31′S 143°31′W. The highest summit, 1,155 metres (3,789 ft) high, in the Mackay Mountains, situated 1.5 nautical miles (2.8 km; 1.7 mi) northeast of Vivian Nunatak in the southwest part of the group. Mapped by USAS (1939–41) and by USGS from surveys and United States Navy air photos (1959-65) Named by US-ACAN for Lieutenant Laurence C. Monson III, United States Navy Reserve, co-pilot of LC-130F Hercules aircraft during Operation Deep Freeze 1968.

=== Mount Palombo ===
77°29′S 143°12′W. A mountain 1,030 metres (3,380 ft) high marking the northeast end of the Mackay Mountains. Mapped by USAS (1939–41) and by USGS from surveys and United States Navy air photos (1959-65). Named by US-ACAN for Lieutenant Robert A. Palombo, United States Navy, aircraft commander during Operation Deep Freeze 1968.

=== Lewisohn Nunatak ===
77°38′S 142°50′W. An isolated nunatak, 10 nautical miles (19 km; 12 mi) high, southeast of the Mackay Mountains. Discovered and mapped by the USAS (1939-41). Named by US-ACAN for Walter P. Lewisohn, radio operator with the ByrdAE (1933-35).

== Sources ==
- Adams, C.J. (1986), "Geochronological studies of the Swanson Formation of Marie Byrd Land, West Antarctica, and correlation with northern Victoria Land, East Antarctica, and South Island, New Zealand", New Zealand Journal of Geology and Geophysics, 29: 345–358
- Alberts, Fred G., ed. (1995), Geographic Names of the Antarctic (PDF) (2 ed.), United States Board on Geographic Names This article incorporates public domain material from websites or documents of the United States Board on Geographic Names.
- Boyd Glacier, USGS: United States Geological Survey
- This article incorporates public domain material from websites or documents of the United States Geological Survey.
