= Radford Island =

Island in Marie Byrd Land, Antarctica

- Location within Antarctica

Geography
- Location: Marie Byrd Land, Antarctica
- Coordinates: 76°54′S 146°36′W

Radford Island (76°54′S 146°36′W) is an ice-covered island surmounted by several peaks, lying 6 nautical miles (11 km; 6.9 mi) west of Saunders Mountain in the east part of Sulzberger Ice Shelf, Antarctica.

== Discovery and name ==
Radford Island was discovered by the Byrd Antarctic Expedition (ByrdAE) on the Eastern Flight of 5 December 1929. This feature was mapped as a part of the mainland by the United States Antarctic Service (USAS) (1939–1941) and named "Radford Mountains." It was determined to be an island by the United States Geological Survey (USGS) from air photos taken by the United States Navy, 1962–1965. Named by Byrd for Vice Admiral Arthur W. Radford, U.S. Navy, Deputy Chief of Naval Operations (Air) during the exploration by United States Navy Operation Highjump (1946–1947) and later Admiral and Chairman of the Joint Chiefs of Staff.

== Location ==
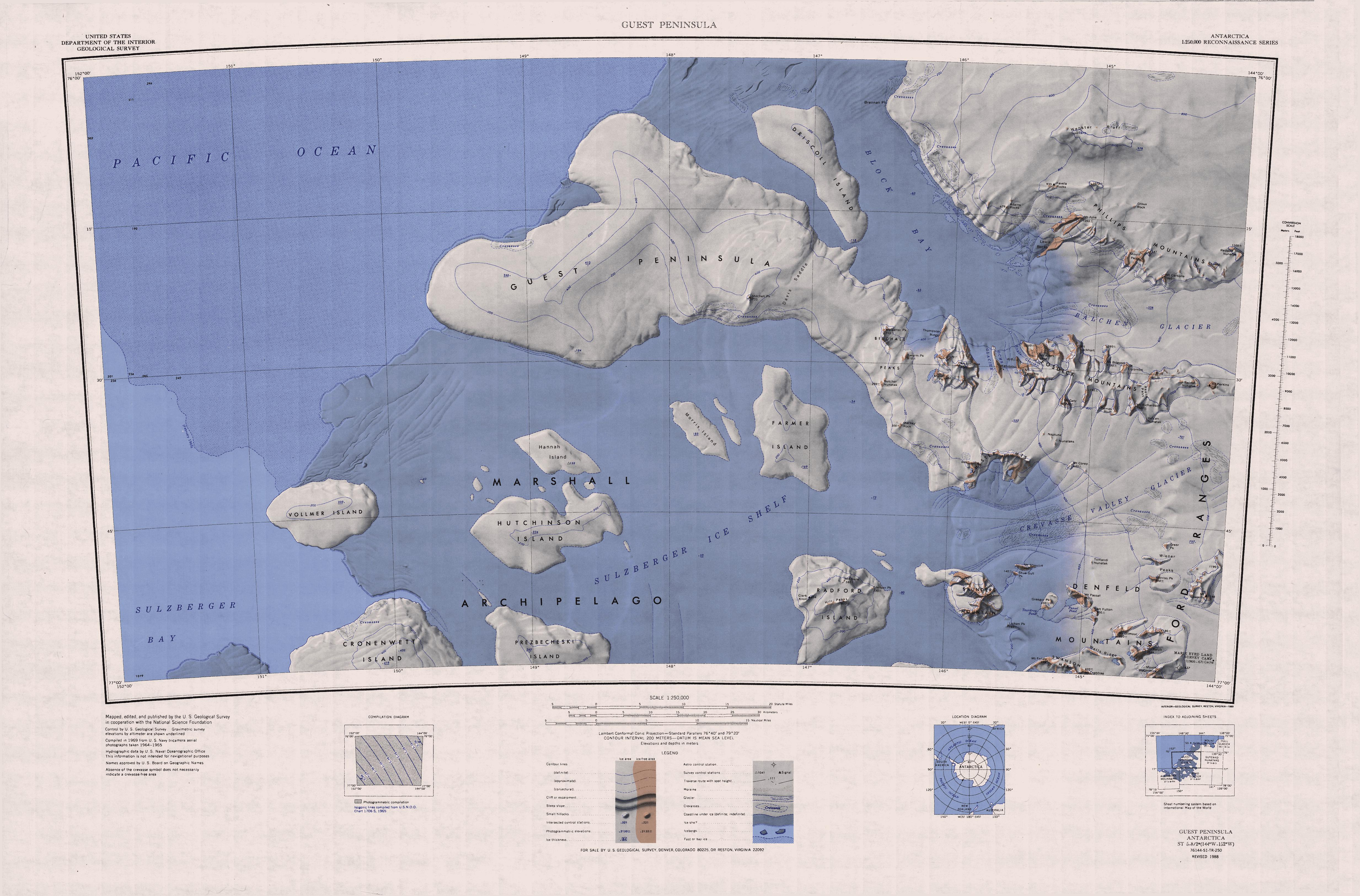
Radford Island in southeast of the ice shelf

Radford Island is in the southeast of the Marshall Archipelago, in the Sulzberger Ice Shelf. Features include the Hill Peaks, Clark Knoll, Mount Dane and Eilefsen Peak.

== Features ==
=== Hill Peaks ===
76°54′S 146°42′W. A small group of peaks 2 nautical miles (3.7 km; 2.3 mi) southwest of Mount Dane in the west part of Radford Island. The peaks were probably first observed by the ByrdAE (1928-30) on an aerial flight of December 5, 1929. Named by the United States Advisory Committee on Antarctic Names (US-ACAN) for Joseph Hill, Jr., mechanic and driver with the ByrdAE (1933-35).

=== Clark Knoll ===
76°53′S 146°59′W. An ice-covered knoll 4 nautical miles (7.4 km; 4.6 mi) southwest of Mount Dane in the west part of Radford Island. Mapped by USAS (1939-41) and by USGS from surveys and United States Navy air photos (1959-65). Named by US-ACAN for Elton G. Clark, utilitiesman, United States Navy, at Byrd Station in 1967.

=== Mount Dane ===
76°51′S 146°40′W. A mountain 3 nautical miles (5.6 km; 3.5 mi) west-northwest of Eilefsen Peak in the north part of Radford Island. The mountain was probably first seen on aerial flights by the ByrdAE (1928-30). Named by US-ACAN for F.S. Dane, dog driver with the ByrdAE (1933-35).

=== Eilefsen Peak ===
76°52′S 146°25′W. A peak in the northeast part of Radford Island. The peak was probably seen on an aerial flight by the ByrdAE (1928-30). Named by US-ACAN for Albert Eilefsen, driver with the ByrdAE (1933-35).

== Sources ==
- Alberts, Fred G., ed. (1995), Geographic Names of the Antarctic (PDF) (2 ed.), United States Board on Geographic Names This article incorporates public domain material from websites or documents of the United States Board on Geographic Names.
- Guest Peninsula, USGS: United States Geological Survey
- This article incorporates public domain material from websites or documents of the United States Geological Survey.
