= Clark Mountains =

Mountains in Marie Byrd Land, Antarctica

- Location within Antarctica

Geography
- Continent: Antarctica
- Area: Marie Byrd Land
- Range coordinates: 77°16′S 142°0′W
- Parent range: Ford Ranges

The Clark Mountains (77°16′S 142°0′W) are a group of low mountains rising above 1,200 metres (3,900 ft) located in the Ford Ranges, Marie Byrd Land, Antarctica. They are about 10 nautical miles (19 km; 12 mi) east of the Allegheny Mountains.

== Location ==
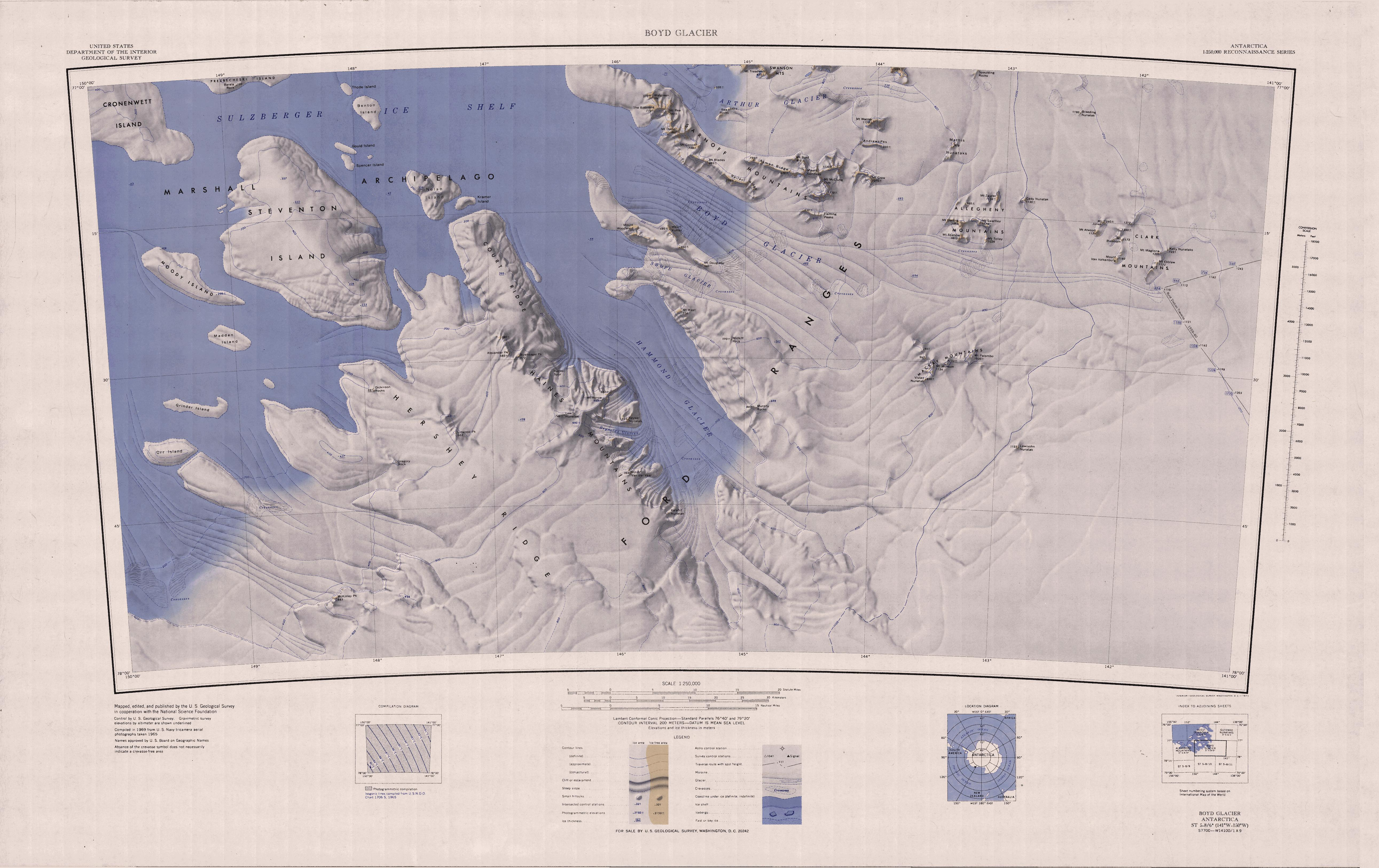
Clark Mountains in northeast of map

The Clark Mountains are north of the head of the Boyd Glacier, northeast of the Mackay Mountains and east of the Allegheny Mountains. Features include, from west to east, Mount Atwood, Mount Jones, Mount Burnham, Mount Van Valkenburg, Mount Maglione, Mount Ekblaw and the Kelly Nunataks.

== Discovery and name ==
The Clark Mountains were discovered and photographed on aerial flights in 1940 by the United States Antarctic Service (USAS) and named for Clark University in Worcester, Massachusetts.

== Features ==
=== Mount Atwood ===
77°16′S 142°17′W. A mountain, 1,180 metres (3,870 ft) high, at the west edge of the Clark Mountains. Discovered by the USAS in 1940 on aerial flights from the West Base. Named by the USAS for the late president emeritus W.W. Atwood, Sr., of Clark University, noted geologist and geographer, and his son, W.W. Atwood, Jr., who collaborated with his father in glaciological studies.

=== Mount Jones ===
77°14′S 142°11′W. The northernmost summit of the Clark Mountains. Discovered on aerial flights from West Base of the USAS in 1940. Named for Clarence F. Jones, professor of geography at Clark University.

=== Mount Burnham ===
77°16′S 142°05′W. A mountain, 1,170 metres (3,840 ft) high, standing 2 nautical miles (3.7 km; 2.3 mi) north of Mount Van Valkenburg. Discovered on aerial flights from West Base of the USAS in 1940 and named for Guy Burnham, Cartographer in the School of Geography of Clark University.

=== Mount Van Valkenburg ===
77°19′S 142°06′W. A mountain, 1,165 metres (3,822 ft) high, standing 1 nautical mile (1.9 km; 1.2 mi) south of Mount Burnham. Discovered on aerial flights from West Base of the USAS (1939–41). Named for Professor. Samuel Van Valkenburg, Director of the School of Geography at Clark University.

=== Mount Maglione ===
77°18′S 141°47′W. A low mountain 1 nautical mile (1.9 km; 1.2 mi) northeast of Mount Ekblaw. Mapped by the United States Geological Survey (USGS) from surveys and United States Navy air photos, 1959-65. Named by the United States Advisory Committee on Antarctic Names (US-ACAN) for Lieutenant (j.g.) Charles R. Maglione, United States Navy Reserve, navigator on LC-130F Hercules aircraft during Operation Deep Freeze 1968.

=== Mount Ekblaw ===
77°19′S 141°48′W. A mountain, 1,235 metres (4,052 ft) high, standing 3 nautical miles (5.6 km; 3.5 mi) east of Mount Van Valkenburg in the east part of the Clark Mountains. Discovered on aerial flights from the West Base of the USAS in 1940. Named for W.E. Ekblaw, professor of geography at Clark University and a member of the Crocker Land Expedition in the Arctic (1913-17).

=== Kelly Nunataks ===
77°17′S 141°44′W. The nunataks that mark the east extremity of the Clark Mountains. Mapped by USGS from surveys and United States Navy air photos, 1959-65. Named by US-ACAN for John David Kelly, United States Antarctic Research Program (USARP) ionospheric physicist at Byrd Station, 1968.

== Sources ==
- U. S. Board on Geographic Names; Water Resources Division, U. S. Geological Survey; Defense Mapping Agency; National Science Foundation (1995), Alberts, Fred G. (ed.), "Geographic Names of the Antarctic" (PDF), USGS Report (2 ed.), United States Board on Geographic Names: 3, Bibcode:1995usgs.rept....3U This article incorporates public domain material from websites or documents of the United States Board on Geographic Names.
- Boyd Glacier, USGS: United States Geological Survey
- This article incorporates public domain material from websites or documents of the United States Geological Survey.
