= Andrews Peak (disambiguation) =

Andrews Peak is a mountain of Antarctica.

Andrews Peak may also refer to:

- Andrews Peak (Tuolumne County, California)

== See also ==
- Andrews Peaks
- Mount Andrews
