= Guest Peninsula =

Snow-covered peninsula in Marie Byrd Land, Antarctica

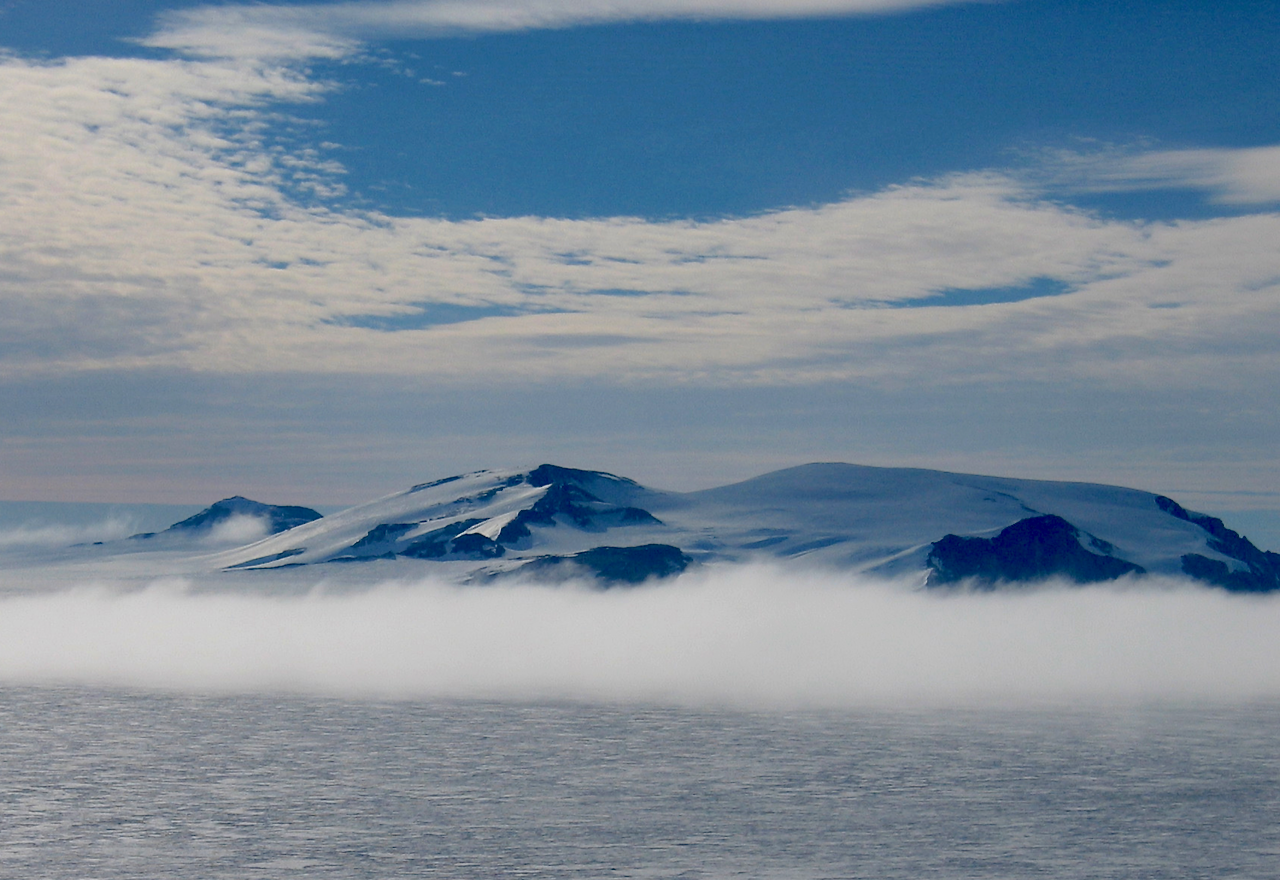
- Mount Iphigene

- Location within Antarctica

Geography
- Location: Marie Byrd Land, Antarctica
- Coordinates: 76°18′S 148°00′W

Demographics
- Population: 0

The Guest Peninsula (76°18′S 148°00′W) is a snow-covered peninsula about 45 nautical miles (83 km; 52 mi) long between the Sulzberger Ice Shelf and Block Bay, in the northwest part of Marie Byrd Land, Antarctica.

== Location ==
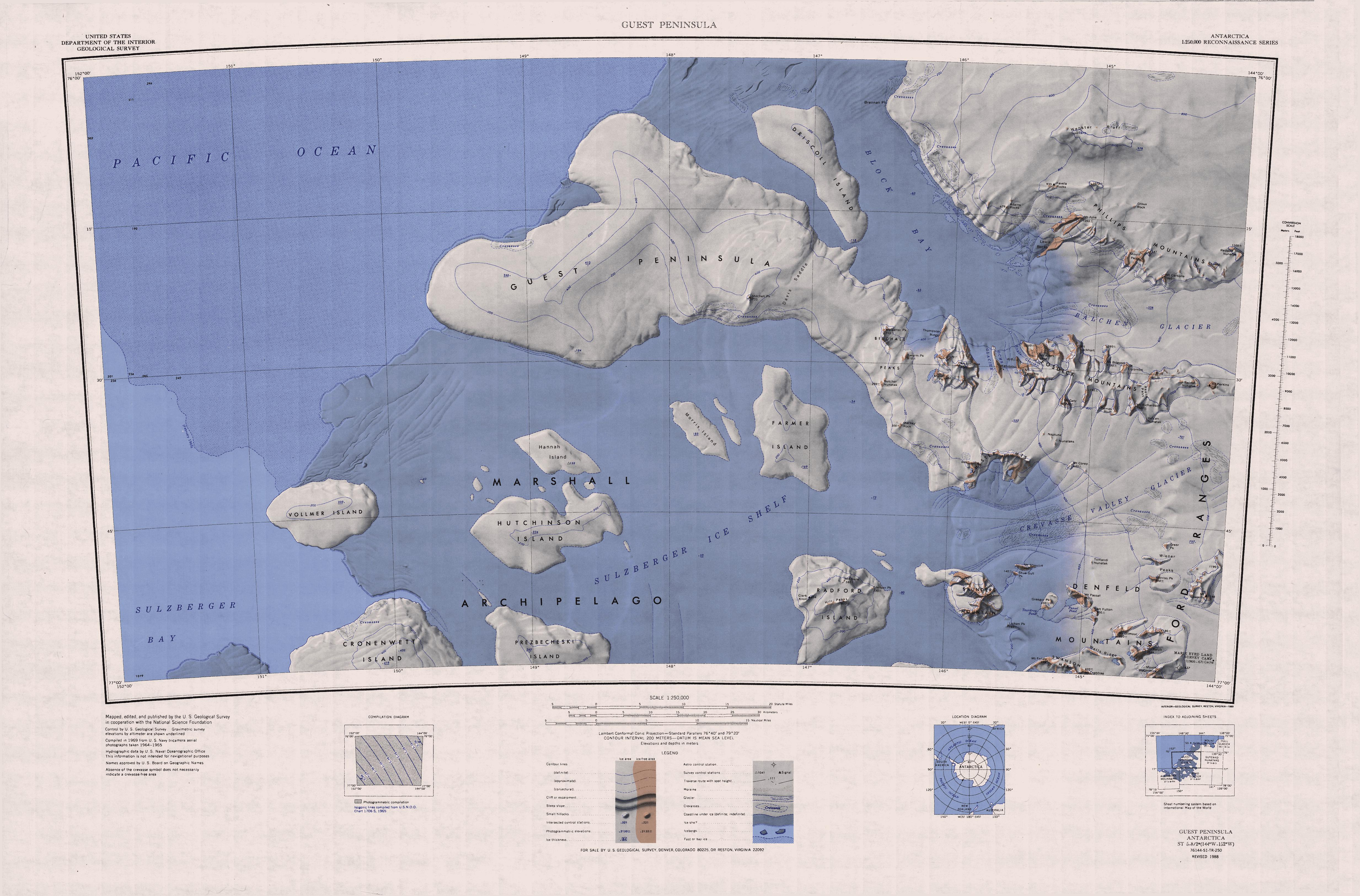
Guest Peninsula

The Guest Peninsula extends westward into the Pacific Ocean from the Fosdick Mountains of the Ford Ranges in Marie Byrd Land. The Sulzberger Ice Shelf and Marshall Archipelago are to the southwest. The Crevasse Valley Glacier enters the ice shelf from the south of the peninsula. Driscoll Island and Block Bay are to the northeast. The Balchen Glacier enters Block Bay to the north of the peninsula.

The western part of the peninsula is devoid of named features. Mitchell Peak and Davis Saddle are near the center of the peninsula. The Birchall Peaks are east of this, including Maigetter Peak, Swarm Peak and Butcher Nunatak. Features in the southeast of the peninsula include Mackey Rock, the Chester Mountains, Neptune Nunataks and Mount Corey. Features in the northeast include Thompson Ridge, Mutel Peak, Mount Iphigene, Ochs Glacier and Marujupu Peak.

== Discovery and naming ==
Mitchell Peak, located on the peninsula, was sighted by the first Byrd Antarctic Expedition (ByrdAE) in 1929. This feature was defined and mapped as "Guest Island" by the United States Antarctic Service Expedition in 1940. It was determined to be a peninsula by United States Geological Survey (USGS) cartographers from air photos taken by the United States Navy in 1962–65. It is named for Amy Guest, a contributor to the Byrd Antarctic Expedition of 1933–35.

== Central features ==
=== Mitchell Peak ===
76°25′S 147°22′W. A solitary peak 13 nautical miles (24 km; 15 mi) west of Birchall Peaks on the south side of Guest Peninsula in Marie Byrd Land. It was sighted by Rear Admiral Richard E. Byrd, December 5, 1929, while on an airplane flight over this coast. Named by Byrd for Hugh C. Mitchell, mathematician of the United States Coast and Geodetic Survey, a member of the National Geographic Society committee of experts which determined that Byrd reached both the North and South Poles by airplane in 1926 and 1929, respectively.

=== Davis Saddle ===
76°23′S 147°09′W. An ice saddle just eastward of Mitchell Peak. Mapped by the United States Geological Survey (USGS) from surveys and United States Navy air photos, 1959-65. Named by the United States Advisory Committee on Antarctic Names (US-ACAN) for Clinton S. Davis, BM2, United States Navy, Boatswain's Mate aboard USS Glacier along this coast, 1961-62.

=== Birchall Peaks ===
76°29′S 146°20′W. Group of peaks 3 nautical miles (5.6 km; 3.5 mi) west of Mount Iphigene, on the south side of Block Bay. Discovered in 1929 by the ByrdAE. Named by Byrd for Frederick T. Birchall, member of the staff of the New York Times which published the expedition's press dispatches.

=== Maigetter Peak ===
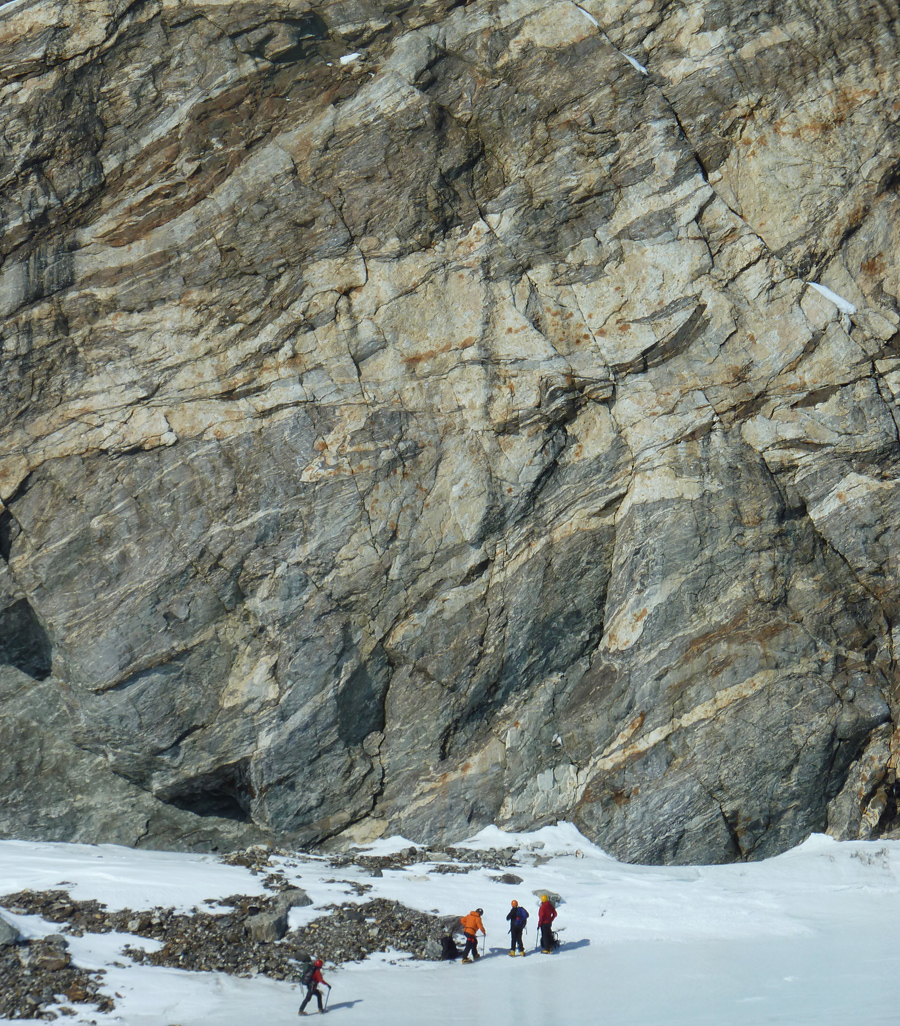
Migmatite geology at Maigetter Peak

76°27′S 146°29′W. A rock peak, the northernmost of the Birchall Peaks, on the south shore of Block Bay. Discovered by the ByrdAE (1928-30) and plotted from photos taken on the flight of December 5, 1929. Mapped by USGS from surveys and United States Navy air photos (1959-65). Named by US-ACAN for Robert Z. Maigetter, biologist with the USARP Marie Byrd Land Survey II, 1967-68.

=== Swarm Peak ===
76°29′S 146°20′W. A rock peak 610 metres (2,000 ft) high which is the easternmost of the Birchall Peaks. Photographed from the air and roughly plotted by the ByrdAE, 1928-30, but mapped definitively by the United States Antarctic Service (USAS), 1939–41. Named by US-ACAN for H. Myron Swarm, USARP ionospheric physicist at Byrd Station in the 1966-67 season.

=== Butcher Nunatak ===
76°32′S 146°30′W. A nunatak at the south end of the Birchall Peaks, 4 nautical miles (7.4 km; 4.6 mi) southwest of Swarm Peak. Mapped by USGS from surveys and United States Navy air photos (1959-65). Named by US-ACAN for Robert S. Butcher, builder, United States Navy, at Byrd Station in 1967.

== Southeastern features ==
=== Mackey Rock ===
76°36′S 146°22′W. An isolated rock on the east side of Sulzberger Ice Shelf, 8 nautical miles (15 km; 9.2 mi) southwest of Mount Iphigene. Mapped by USGS from surveys and United States Navy air photos (1959-65). Named by US-ACAN for Steven Mackey, field assistant with the USARP Marie Byrd Land Survey II, summer 1967-68.

=== Chester Mountains ===
76°40′S 145°35′W. Group of mountains just north of the mouth of Crevasse Valley Glacier and 10 nautical miles (19 km; 12 mi) north of Saunders Mountain. Mapped by the ByrdAE (1933-35) and named for Colby Mitchell Chester, president of General Foods Corporation, who gave generous support to the Byrd expeditions.

=== Neptune Nunataks ===
76°37′S 145°18′W. A small group of nunataks between the Chester and Fosdick Mountains. Mapped by the USAS (1939–41) and by USGS from surveys and United States Navy air photos (1959-65). Named by US-ACAN for Gary D. Neptune, geologist with the Marie Byrd Land Survey II, 1967-68 season.

=== Mount Corey ===
76°40′S 145°08′W. Mountain 3 nautical miles (5.6 km; 3.5 mi) east of the Chester Mountains. Discovered by a ByrdAE sledging party which visited the area in November 1934. Named for Stevenson Corey, a member of the sledge party.

== Sources ==
- Alberts, Fred G., ed. (1995), Geographic Names of the Antarctic (PDF) (2 ed.), United States Board on Geographic Names This article incorporates public domain material from websites or documents of the United States Board on Geographic Names.
- Guest Peninsula, USGS: United States Geological Survey
