= Judge Andrews =

Judge Andrews may refer to:

- Charles B. Andrews (1834–1902), judge of the Connecticut Superior Court
- Charles O. Andrews (1877–1946), circuit judge of the seventeenth judicial circuit of Florida
- Charles O. Andrews Jr. (1910–1969), judge of the Second District Appellate Court of Florida
- Landaff Andrews (1803–1888), judge of the circuit court of Kentucky
- M. Neil Andrews (1894–1967), judge of the United States District Court for the Northern District of Georgia
- Richard G. Andrews (born 1955), judge of the United States District Court for the District of Delaware
- Sherlock James Andrews (1801–1880), judge of the superior court of Cleveland

== See also ==
- Justice Andrews (disambiguation)
