= Hershey Ridge =

Ridge

- Location within Antarctica

Highest point
- Coordinates: 77°40′S 147°10′W

Hershey Ridge (77°40′S 147°10′W) is a low, ice-covered ridge trending in a northwest–southeast direction for about 30 nautical miles (56 km; 35 mi) between McKinley Peak and the Haines Mountains, in the Ford Ranges of Marie Byrd Land, Antarctica.

== Location ==
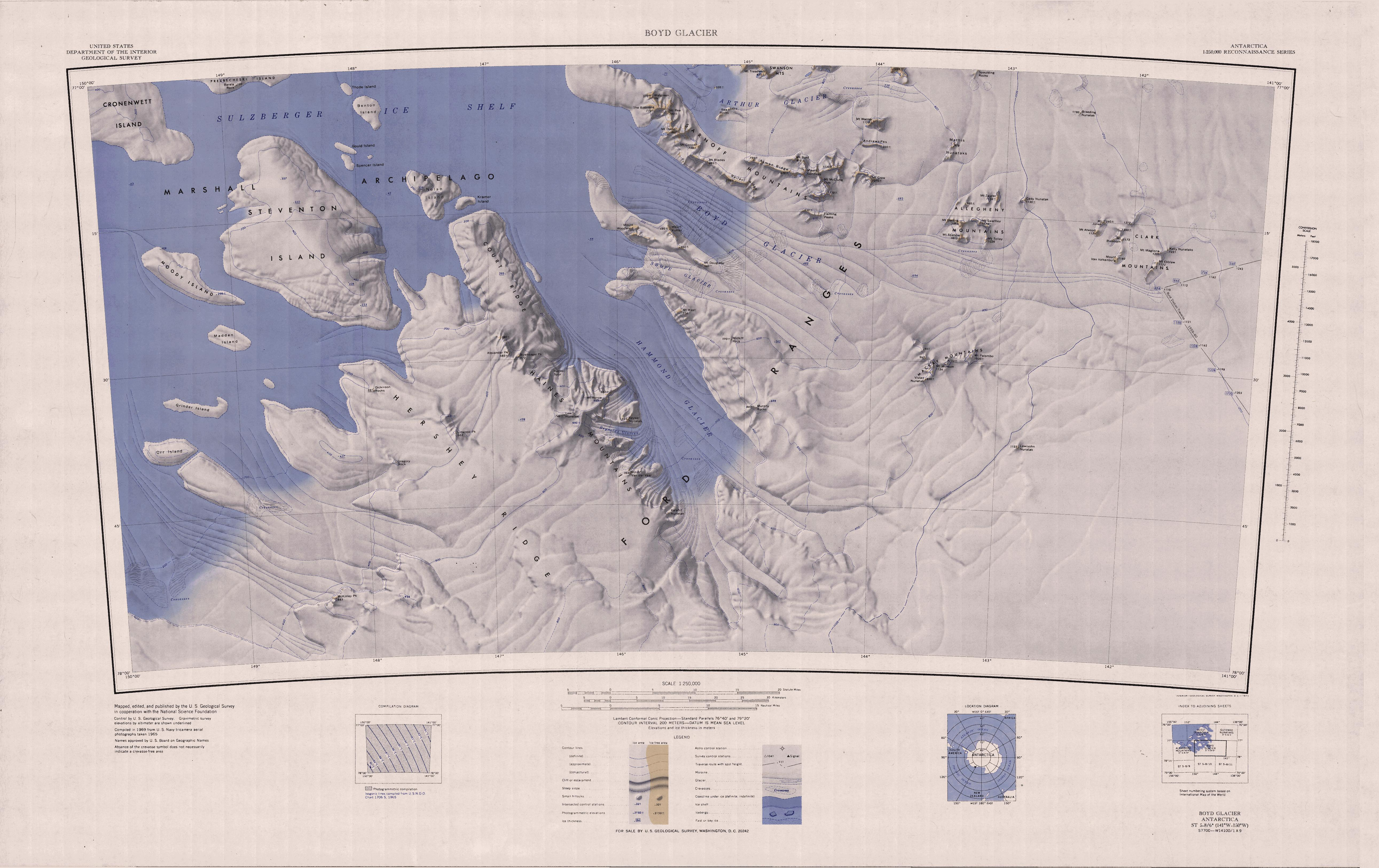
Hershey Ridge is southwest of map

Hershey Ridge is in the Ford Ranges, west of the Haines Mountains and northeast of McKinley Peak. It runs in a northwest direction to the Sulzberger Ice Shelf to the south of Steventon Island. Features include Dickinson Rocks, Gregory Rock and Linwood Peak.

== Discovery and name ==
Hershey Ridge was discovered in 1934 by the Byrd Antarctic Expedition (ByrdAE), and named for Garland Hershey, Assistant State Geologist of the Iowa Geological Survey (1939–47) and Director of the Iowa Geological Survey after 1947.

== Features ==
=== Dickinson Rocks ===
77°33′S 147°55′W. Isolated rock outcrops near the north end of Hershey Ridge, 9 nautical miles (17 km; 10 mi) northwest of Linwood Peak. Mapped by the United States Antarctic Service (USAS) (1939-41) and by USGS from surveys and United States Navy air photos (1959-65). Named by the United States Advisory Committee on Antarctic Names (US-ACAN) for David N. Dickinson, construction mechanic, United States Navy, at Brockton Station (80|S, 178|W) on the Ross Ice Shelf for two seasons, 1965-66 and 1966-67.

=== Gregory Rock ===
77°40′S 147°46′W. A rock that outcrops above the ice slopes of western Hershey Ridge, 7 nautical miles (13 km; 8.1 mi) west-southwest of Linwood Peak. Mapped by the United States Geological Survey (USGS) from surveys and United States Navy air photos, 1959-65. Named by US-ACAN for Elmer D. Gregory, aviation maintenance line crew supervisor at Williams Field, McMurdo Sound, during Operation Deep Freeze 1967.

=== Linwood Peak ===
77°36′S 147°13′W. An isolated peak on Hershey Ridge, standing 14 nautical miles (26 km; 16 mi) west of Mount Ronne. Discovered and mapped by the USAS (1939–41). Named by US-ACAN for Linwood T. Miller, sailmaker with the ByrdAE (1933-35).

== Sources ==
- Alberts, Fred G., ed. (1995), Geographic Names of the Antarctic (PDF) (2 ed.), United States Board on Geographic Names This article incorporates public domain material from websites or documents of the United States Board on Geographic Names.
- Boyd Glacier, USGS: United States Geological Survey
- This article incorporates public domain material from websites or documents of the United States Geological Survey.
