= Ford Ranges =

Group of mountain ranges in Antarctica

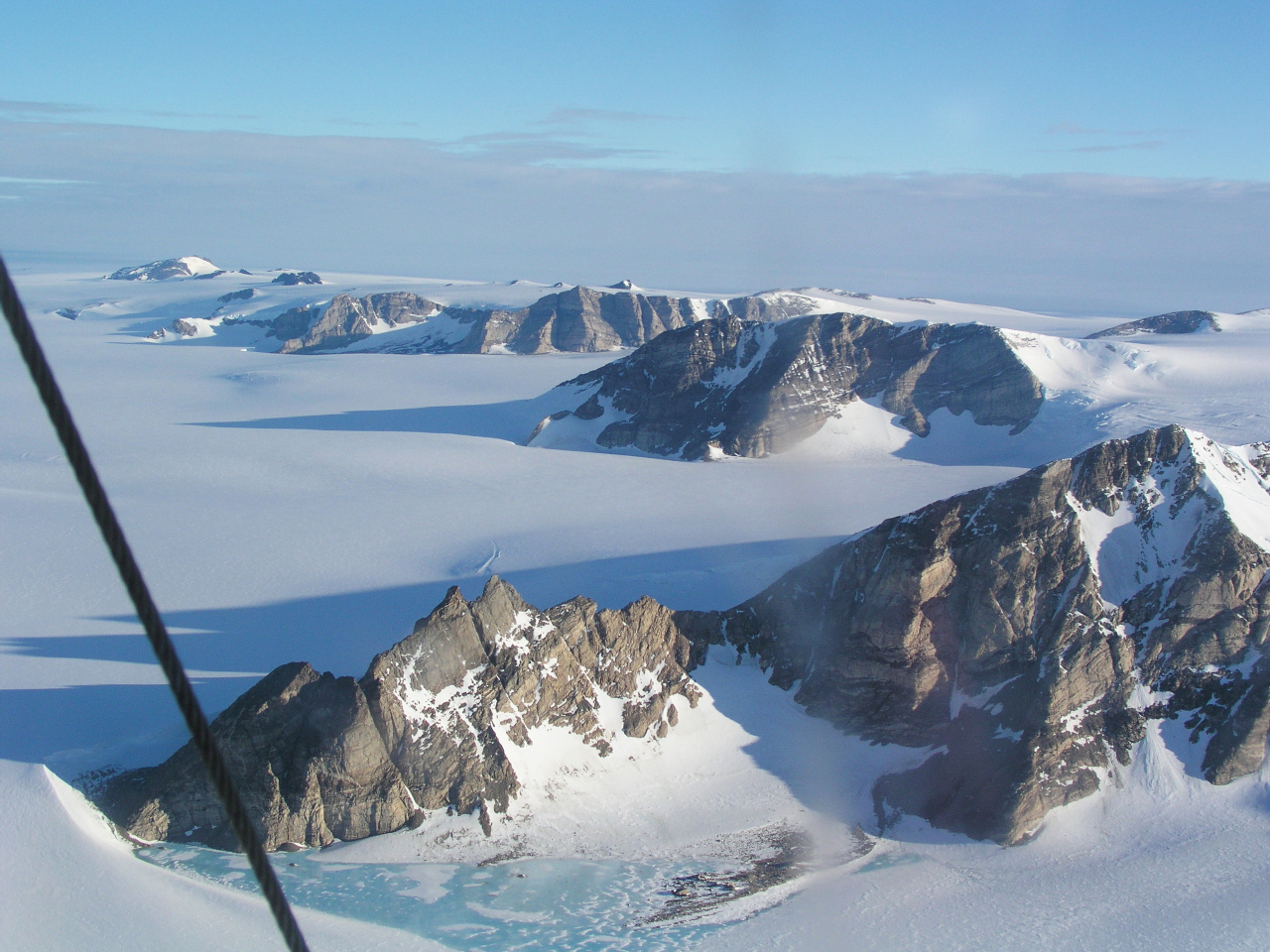
- Aerial view of north side of Fosdick Mountains

Geography
- Location within Antarctica
- Continent: Antarctica
- Area: Marie Byrd Land
- Range coordinates: 77°0′S 144°0′W

The Ford Ranges (77°0′S 144°0′W) are a collection of mountain groups and ranges standing east of Sulzberger Ice Shelf and Block Bay in the northwest part of Marie Byrd Land, Antarctica.

== Location ==
The Ford Ranges lie along the coast of Marie Byrd Land to the south and east of the Sulzberger Ice Shelf and to the east of Block Bay. The ranges and major glaciers are, from southwest to northeast, Hershey Ridge, Haines Mountains, Hammond Glacier, Swope Glacier, Mackay Mountains, Boyd Glacier, Sarnoff Mountains, Allegheny Mountains, Clark Mountains, Arthur Glacier, Denfeld Mountains, Crevasse Valley Glacier, Chester Mountains, Fosdick Mountains, Balchen Glacier and Phillips Mountains.

A 1945 report defines the Southern Ford Ranges as the ranges between McKinley Peak and the Balchen Glacier, which excludes the Phillips Mountains. They cover an area of about 7,000 square miles (18,000 km^{2}). This portion of the mountainous coastland of Marie Byrd Land is one of the few areas in Antarctica where there are enough rock outcrops to make it practical to undertake geological mapping. A 1991 report defines the Northern Ford Ranges as including the Phillips, Fosdick and Chester Mountains. The Fosdick Mountains contain high-grade metamorphic rocks, while the Phillips and Chester Mountains have outcroppings of plutonic rocks. The Devonian Ford granodiorite is found in the Phillips, Chester and Denfield Mountains. The Cretaceous Byrd Coast granite is found throughout the Ford Ranges.

== Discovery and name ==
The Ford Ranges were discovered by the Byrd Antarctic Expedition (ByrdAE) on December 5, 1929. They were named by Richard E. Byrd for Edsel Ford of the Ford Motor Company, who helped finance the expedition.

== Glaciers ==
- Hammond Glacier (77°25′S 146°00′W), a glacier on the northeast side of the Haines Mountains, flowing northwest for about 40 nautical miles (74 km; 46 mi) to Sulzberger Ice Shelf.
- Swope Glacier (77°20′S 145°50′W), a glacier which drains westward from the Ford Ranges, between Mount Woodward and Mount West, into Sulzberger Ice Shelf.
- Boyd Glacier (77°14′S 145°25′W), a heavily crevassed glacier flowing west-northwest for about 45 nautical miles (83 km; 52 mi) to the Sulzberger Ice Shelf between Bailey Ridge and Mount Douglass.
- Arthur Glacier (77°03′S 145°15′W), a valley glacier about 25 nautical miles (46 km; 29 mi) long, flowing west to Sulzberger Ice Shelf between the Swanson Mountains on the north and Mount Rea and Mount Cooper on the south.
- Crevasse Valley Glacier (76°46′S 145°30′W), a broad glacier about 30 nautical miles (56 km; 35 mi) long, flowing west-southwest between Chester Mountains and Saunders Mountain.
- Balchen Glacier (76°23′S 145°10′W), a crevassed glacier flowing west to Block Bay between the Phillips Mountains and Fosdick Mountains.

== Northern ranges ==
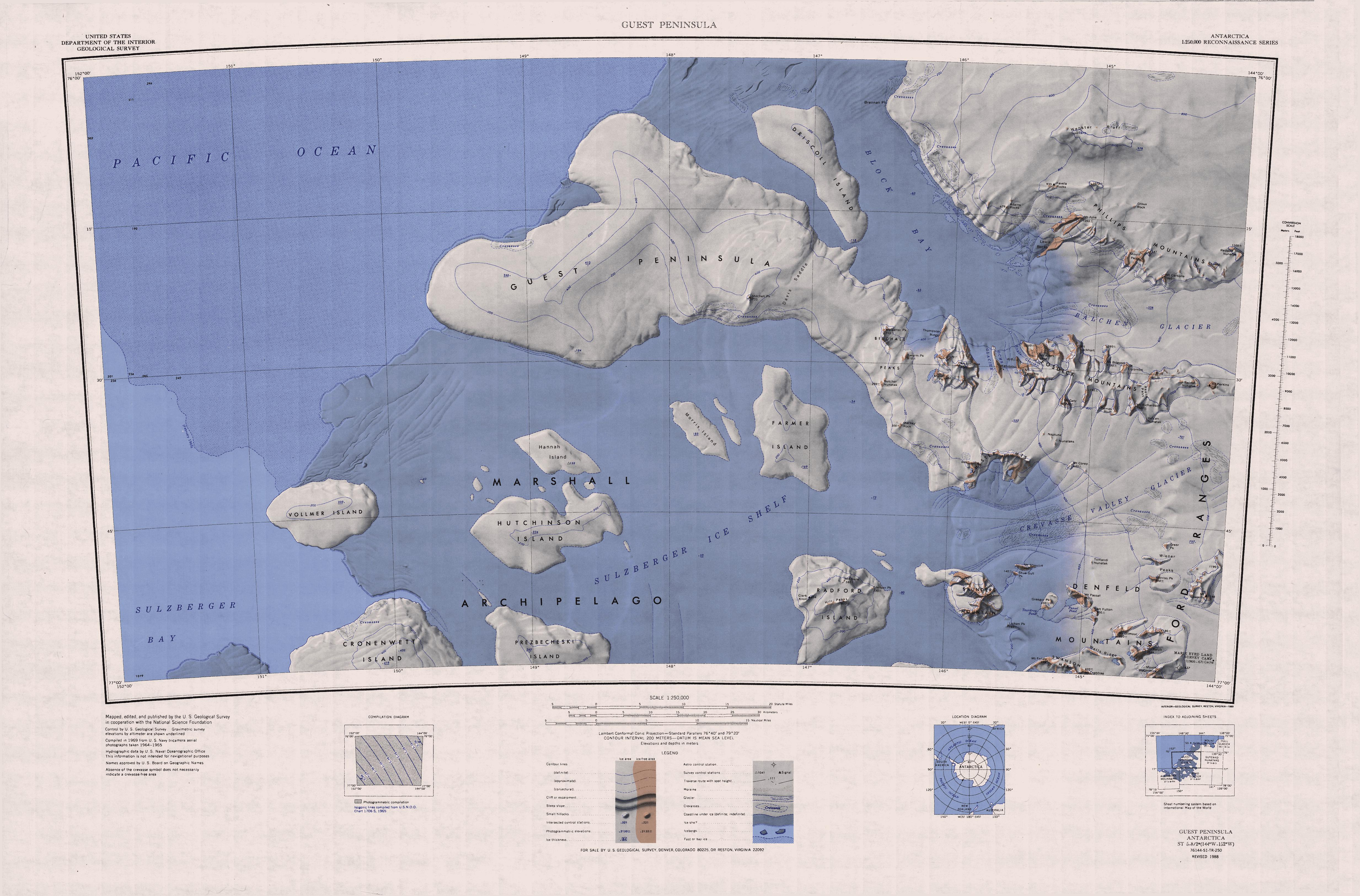
Northern part of Ford Ranges, to the east

The northern mountain ranges and groups are, from north to south

- Phillips Mountains (76°16′S 145°0′W), a range of mountains on the north side of Balchen Glacier and Block Bay.
- Fosdick Mountains (76°32′S 144°45′W), an east–west trending mountain range with marked serrate outlines, standing along the south side of Balchen Glacier at the head of Block Bay.
- Chester Mountains (76°40′S 145°35′W), a group of mountains just north of the mouth of Crevasse Valley Glacier and 10 nautical miles (19 km; 12 mi) north of Saunders Mountain.

== Southern ranges ==
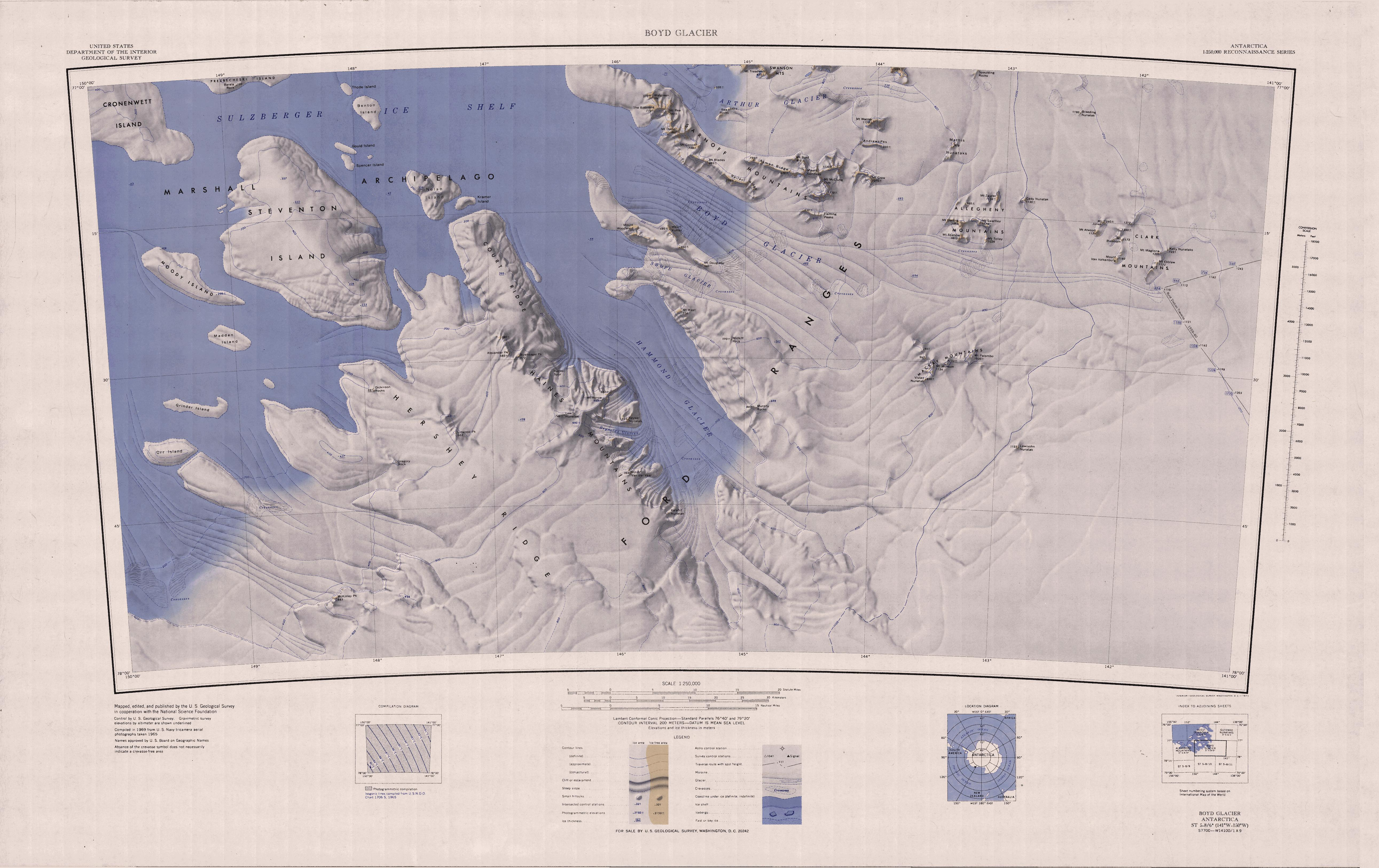
Southern part of Ford Ranges

The southern mountain ranges and groups are, from west to east,

- Hershey Ridge (77°40′S 147°10′W), a low, ice-covered ridge trending in a northwest–southeast direction for about 30 nautical miles (56 km; 35 mi) between McKinley Peak and the Haines Mountains.
- Haines Mountains (77°34′S 146°20′W), a range of ice-capped mountains trending northwest–southeast for about 25 nautical miles (46 km; 29 mi) and forming the southwest wall of Hammond Glacier.
- Mackay Mountains (77°30′S 143°20′W), a prominent group of peaks 10 nautical miles (19 km; 12 mi) south of the Allegheny Mountains.
- Sarnoff Mountains (77°10′S 145°0′W), a range of mountains, 251 nautical miles (465 km; 289 mi) long and 4 to 8 nautical miles (7.4 to 14.8 km; 4.6 to 9.2 mi) wide separating the west-flowing Boyd Glacier and Arthur Glacier.
- Allegheny Mountains (77°15′S 143°18′W), a small group of mountains 10 nautical miles (19 km; 12 mi) west of the Clark Mountains.
- Clark Mountains (77°16′S 142°0′W), a group of low mountains rising above 1,200 metres (3,900 ft). They are about 10 nautical miles (19 km; 12 mi) east of the Allegheny Mountains.
- Denfeld Mountains (76°55′S 144°45′W), a group of scattered mountains between Crevasse Valley Glacier and Arthur Glacier.

== Sources ==
- Alberts, Fred G., ed. (1995), Geographic Names of the Antarctic (PDF) (2 ed.), United States Board on Geographic Names This article incorporates public domain material from websites or documents of the United States Board on Geographic Names.
- Boyd Glacier, USGS: United States Geological Survey
- Guest Peninsula, USGS: United States Geological Survey
- Luyendyk, Bruce P.; Richard, Steve M.; Smith, Christine; Kimbrough, David L. (1991), "Geological and geophysical investigations in the northern Ford Ranges, Marie Byrd Land, West Antarctica" (PDF), Antarctic Journal
- Warner, Lawrence A. (30 April 1945), "Structure and Petrography of the Southern Edsel Ford Ranges, Antarctica", Proceedings of the American Philosophical Society, 89.1 (Reports on Scientific Results of the United States Antarctic Service Expedition, 1939–1941): 78–122
- This article incorporates public domain material from websites or documents of the United States Geological Survey.
