= Denfeld Mountains =

Mountain group in Marie Byrd Land, Antarctica

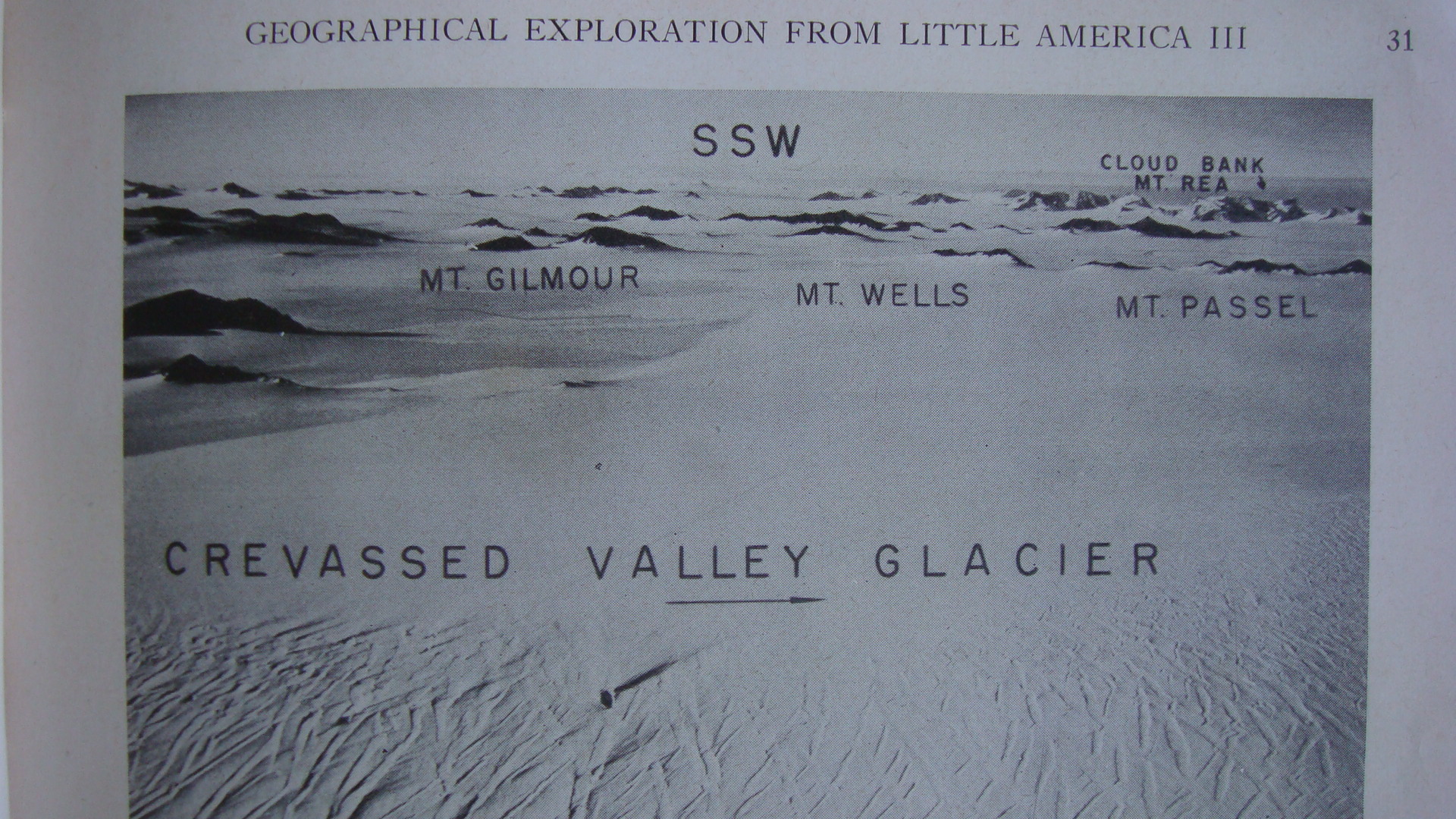
- View looking SSE of Mount Gilmore, Wells Ridge and Mount Passel, Crevasse Valley Glacier in foreground.

Highest point
- Elevation: 577 m (1,893 ft)

Geography
- Location within Antarctica
- Continent: Antarctica
- Area: Marie Byrd Land
- Range coordinates: 76°55′S 144°45′W
- Parent range: Ford Ranges

The Denfeld Mountains (76°55′S 144°45′W) are a group of scattered mountains between Crevasse Valley Glacier and Arthur Glacier in the Ford Ranges of Marie Byrd Land, Antarctica.

== Location ==
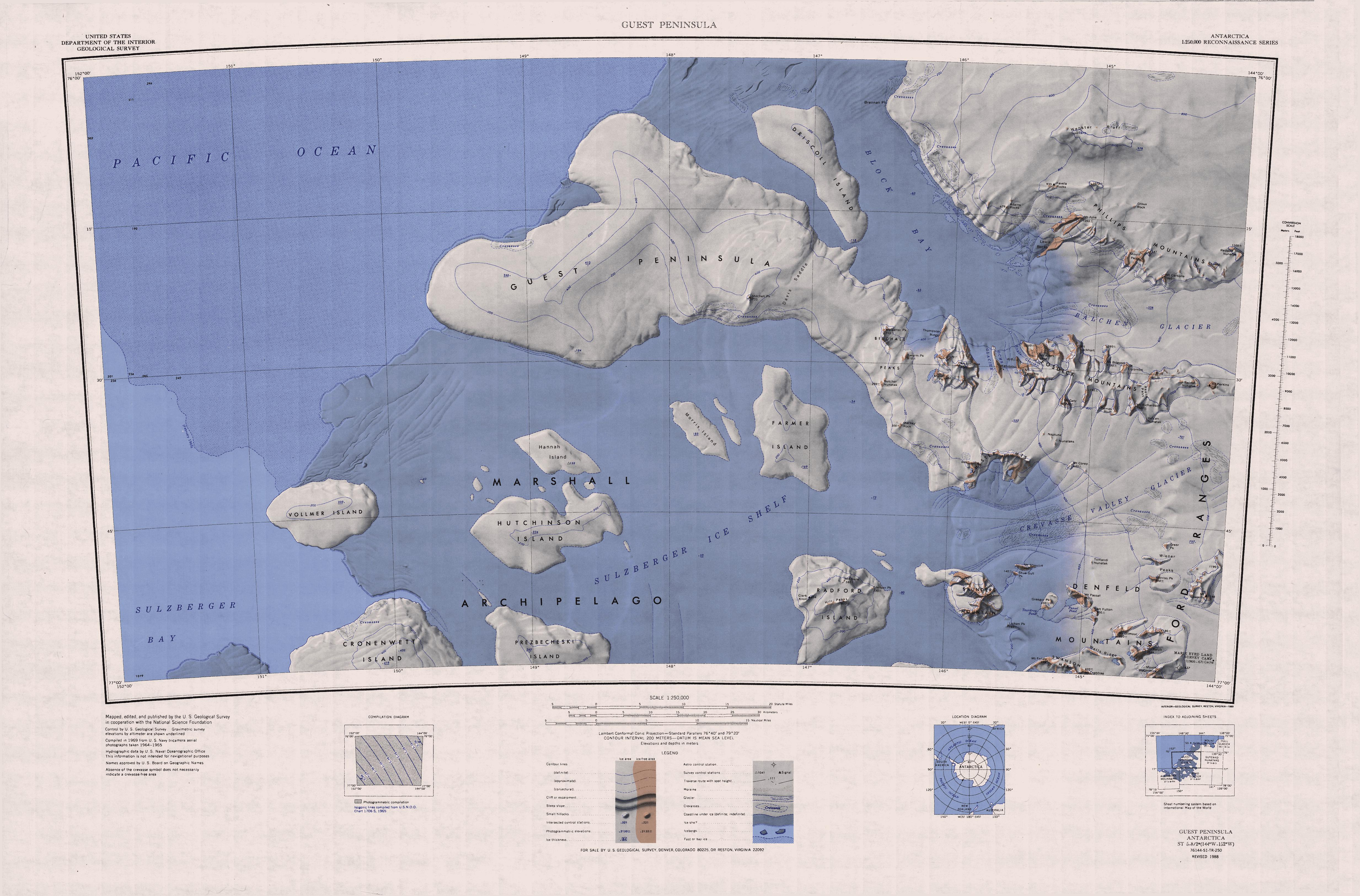
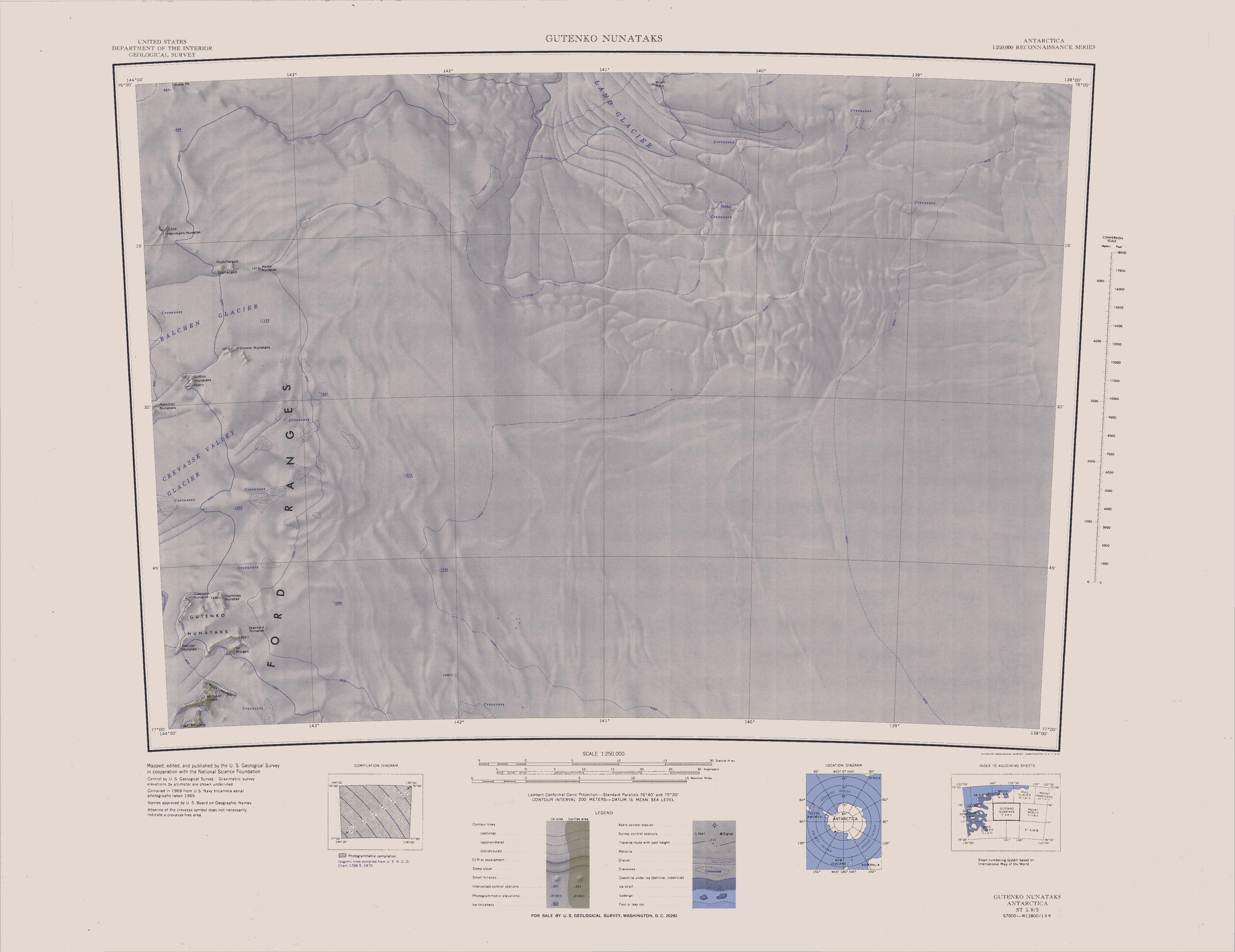
Denfeld Mountains in extreme southeast of the left map, extreme southwest of the right map

The Denfeld Mountains are on the Saunders Coast of Marie Byrd Land. They are to the east of Radford Island in the Sulzberger Ice Shelf, south of the Crevasse Valley Glacier and the Fosdick Mountains, and north of the Arthur Glacier and the Sarnoff Mountains. The Gutenko Nunataks are to the northeast. Features in the northwest include Saunders Mountain, Skua Gull Peak, Mount Stancliff, Lichen Peak, Teardrop Pond, Greegor Peak, Passel Pond, Mount Passel, Mount Fulton and Tomandl Nunatak. Features in the northeast include the Wiener Peaks, Greer Peak, Morriss Peak and Mount Edwards. Features in the south include the Swanson Mountains, Mount Fonda, Mount Crabtree, Mount Treadwell, Wells Ridge, Mount Gilmour, Mount Ralph, Mount McCormick, Mount Little, Mount Swan and Post Ridge.

== Exploration and name ==
The mountains were explored by the Byrd Antarctic Expeditions (ByrdAE; 1928–30 and 1933–35) and by the United States Antarctic Service (USAS; 1939–41) all led by Rear Admiral Richard E. Byrd. They were named for Admiral Louis E. Denfeld, Chief of Naval Operations and a member of the Joint Chiefs of Staff (1947–49), who helped in the planning and organization of Operation Highjump (1946–47) for which Byrd was leader.

== Northwest features ==
=== Saunders Mountain ===
76°53′S 145°42′W. A massive islandlike mountain rising to 975 metres (3,199 ft) high at the west end of Denfeld Mountains. Discovered by the ByrdAE on an aerial flight of December 5, 1929. Named by Rear Admiral Byrd after Captain Harold E. Saunders, United States Navy (1890-1961), naval architect, cartographer and toponymist; chief cartographer of the ByrdAE of 1928-30 and 1933-35, who compiled maps of this coast from aerial photographs obtained by the Byrd expeditions; Technical Director, David Taylor Model Basin, Carderock, MD, 1940–46 (Director, 1946-47); Consultant to Bureau of Ships, United States Navy, to 1961; member of United States Advisory Committee on Antarctic Names (US-ACAN), 1943–46; Chairman, US-ACAN, 1947-61.

=== Skua Gull Peak ===
76°51′S 145°25′W. A peak with a small lake enclosed near the summit, standing 2 nautical miles (3.7 km; 2.3 mi) northeast of Saunders Mountain and 0.5 nautical miles (0.93 km; 0.58 mi) south of Mount Stancliff. Discovered in November 1934 by a sledging party of the ByrdAE (1933-35) and so named because of the skua gull rookery found there.

=== Mount Stancliff ===
76°50′S 145°24′W. A peak 3 nautical miles (5.6 km; 3.5 mi) northeast of Saunders Mountain on the south side of Crevasse Valley Glacier. Discovered by a sledging party of the ByrdAE in November 1934. Named for Olin D. Stancliff, a member of that party.

=== Lichen Peak ===
76°56′S 145°24′W. A peak standing between Saunders Mountain and the Swanson Mountains. Discovered in December 1934 by the ByrdAE sledge party under Paul Siple. So named because of the lichens and other botanical specimens obtained there.

=== Teardrop Pond ===
76°54′S 145°18′W. A meltwater pond 1 nautical mile (1.9 km; 1.2 mi) southwest of Greegor Peak in the Denfeld Mountains. Mapped by the United States Geological Survey (USGS) from surveys and United States Navy air photos, 1959-65. The descriptive name, applied by US-ACAN, is suggestive of the shape of the feature in plan view.

=== Greegor Peak ===
76°53′S 145°14′W. A peak, 550 metres (1,800 ft) high, 3 nautical miles (5.6 km; 3.5 mi) west-southwest of the summit of Mount Passel in the Denfeld Mountains. Mapped by United States Antarctic Service (USAS) (1939–41) and by USGS from surveys and United States Navy air photos (1959-65). Named by US-ACAN for David H. Greegor, biologist with the USARP Marie Byrd Land Survey II, 1967-68.

=== Passel Pond ===
76°53′S 145°05′W. A meltwater pond lying at the southwest foot of Mount Passel in the Denfeld Mountains. The pond was first mapped by the USAS, 1939-41. Named by US-ACAN in association with Mount Passel.

=== Mount Passel ===
76°53′S 144°56′W. A ridgelike mountain 4 nautical miles (7.4 km; 4.6 mi) north of the Swanson Mountains. Discovered in December 1940 by members of a geological party of the USAS which visited this area. Named for Charles F. Passel, geologist and radio operator of that party.

=== Mount Fulton ===
76°53′S 144°54′W. A mountain 900 metres (3,000 ft) high between Mount Passel and Mount Gilmour. Mapped by USAS (1939–41) led by R. Admiral R.E. Byrd. Named for R. Arthur Fulton who was of great assistance in arranging the insurance for the Jacob Ruppert, one of the ships used by the ByrdAE (1933-35).

=== Tomandl Nunatak ===
76°49′S 144°57′W. An isolated nunatak on the south side of Crevasse Valley Glacier, 7 nautical miles (13 km; 8.1 mi) east of Mount Stancliff. Mapped by USGS from surveys and United States Navy air photos, 1959-65. Named by US-ACAN for Frank Tomandl, Jr., aviation electrician's mate, United States Navy, of the McMurdo Station winter party, 1968.

== Northeast features ==
=== Wiener Peaks ===
76°49′S 144°30′W. A group of nunataks 5 nautical miles (9.3 km; 5.8 mi) northeast of Mount Passel. Discovered on aerial flights over this area by the USAS (1939-41). Named for Murray A. Wiener, auroral observer at West Base during this expedition.

=== Greer Peak ===
76°47′S 144°25′W. A prominent peak, the northernmost of the Wiener Peaks. Mapped by the USAS (1939-41) led by R. Admiral R.E. Byrd. Named for Doctor William E.R. Greer, personal physician to Admiral Byrd in the 1950's.

=== Morriss Peak ===
76°50′S 144°29′W. A peak 950 metres (3,120 ft) high at the southwest end of the Wiener Peaks. The peak was mapped by the USAS, 1939-41, led by Byrd, and by the USGS from surveys and United States Navy air photos, 1959-65. The naming was proposed by Admiral Byrd for P.G.B. Morriss, manager of the Hotel Clark in Los Angeles, who provided office space and quarters for Byrd Antarctic Expeditions of 1928-30 and 1933-35.

=== Mount Edwards ===
76°51′S 144°07′W. A mountain 5 nautical miles (9.3 km; 5.8 mi) east-southeast of Morris Peak. Mapped by the USAS (1939-41) led by R. Admiral R.E. Byrd. Named for Leroy P. Edwards who acted as financial advisor to Admiral Byrd with regard to funds for the early Byrd expeditions.

== Southern features ==
=== Swanson Mountains ===
77°00′S 145°00′W. A mountain range 8 nautical miles (15 km; 9.2 mi) long, standing 6 nautical miles (11 km; 6.9 mi) southeast of Saunders Mountain. Discovered on aerial flights by the ByrdAE in 1934. Named for the Hon. Claude A. Swanson, Secretary of the Navy, 1933-39.

=== Mount Fonda ===
76°59′S 145°15′W. A mountain 695 metres (2,280 ft) high in the northwest part of the Swanson Mountains, 6 nautical miles (11 km; 6.9 mi) south of Greegor Peak. Mapped by USAS (1939–41) under R. Admiral R.E. Byrd. Named for Howard B. Fonda who contributed medical supplies to the Byrd Antarctic Expeditions of 1928-30 and 1933-35.

=== Mount Crabtree ===
77°00′S 144°58′W. A mountain 820 metres (2,690 ft) high 4 nautical miles (7.4 km; 4.6 mi) east-southeast of Mount Fonda in the north-central part of the Swanson Mountains. Mapped by the USAS (1939-41) under R. Admiral R.E. Byrd. Named for Doctor E. Granville Crabtree, biologist, who was a consultant in the preparation stages of "Operation Highjump II" (which was cancelled) and for Operation Deep Freeze I (1955-56), for which Admiral Byrd was Officer in Charge, United States Antarctic Programs.

=== Mount Treadwell ===
77°01′S 144°51′W. A mountain 820 metres (2,690 ft) high at the southeast extremity of the Swanson Mountains. Mapped by USAS (1939-41) and by USGS from surveys and United States Navy air photos (1959-65). Named in 1969 by US-ACAN for Captain T.K. Treadwell, United States Navy, who earlier had been Deputy Commander as well as Commander, United States Naval Oceanographic Office.

=== Wells Ridge ===
76°58′S 144°45′W. A rocky ridge 4 nautical miles (7.4 km; 4.6 mi) long between the Swanson Mountains and Mount Gilmour. Discovered on aerial flights made from the West Base of the US AS (1939–41). Named for Loran Wells, photographer and observer with the US AS geology party which visited this ridge in 1940.

=== Mount Gilmour ===
76°56′S 144°40′W. A mountain 4 nautical miles (7.4 km; 4.6 mi) southeast of Mount Passel. Discovered in 1940 by members of West Base of the USAS. Named for Harold P. Gilmour, recorder, and subsequently historian and administrative assistant to the expedition commander.

=== Mount Ralph ===
76°58′S 144°32′W. A mountain between Mount Gilmour and Mount McCormick. Discovered and mapped by the US AS (1939-41). Named by the US-ACAN for Ralph W. Smith, airplane pilot with the ByrdAE (1933-35).

=== Mount McCormick ===
77°00′S 144°26′W. A mountain 2 nautical miles (3.7 km; 2.3 mi) southeast of Mount Ralph. Discovered and mapped by the USAS (1939-41). Named by US-ACAN for W.S. McCormick, airplane pilot with the ByrdAE (1933-35).

=== Mount Little ===
77°00′S 143°51′W. A mainly ice-free mountain 3 nautical miles (5.6 km; 3.5 mi) southwest of Mount Swan. First mapped by the USAS, 1939-41, under Admiral Richard Byrd. Named by US-ACAN at the suggestion of Admiral Byrd for Captain Harold H. Little, United States Navy, who made financial contributions to the Byrd Antarctic Expeditions of 1928-30 and 1933-35, and assisted in the logistic plans for these expeditions.

=== Mount Swan ===
76°58′S 143°45′W. A mountain 4 nautical miles (7.4 km; 4.6 mi) south of Gutenko Nunataks. Discovered and mapped by the USAS (1939–41). Named by US-ACAN for Paul Swan, airplane pilot with the ByrdAE (1933-35).

=== Post Ridge ===
76°56′S 143°38′W. A rock ridge, 3 nautical miles (5.6 km; 3.5 mi) long and trending west-northwest – east-southeast, situated immediately northeast of Mount Swan. Discovered and first mapped by the USAS, 1939-41. Named by US-ACAN for Madison J. Post, ionospheric physicist at Byrd Station in 1970.

== Sources ==
- Alberts, Fred G., ed. (1995), Geographic Names of the Antarctic (PDF) (2 ed.), United States Board on Geographic Names This article incorporates public domain material from websites or documents of the United States Board on Geographic Names.
- Boyd Glacier, USGS: United States Geological Survey
- Guest Peninsula, USGS: United States Geological Survey
- Gutenko Nunataks, USGS: United States Geological Survey
- This article incorporates public domain material from websites or documents of the United States Geological Survey.
