= Andrews, Florida =

Andrews may refer to one of the following places in the US state of Florida:

- Andrews, Levy County, Florida, an unincorporated community and census-designated place
- Andrews, Nassau County, Florida, an unincorporated community north of Hilliard, Florida
- St. Andrews, Florida, a former city annexed by Panama City
- St. Andrews State Park southwest of Panama City
