= Andrews Peak (Tuolumne County, California) =

Mountain in California, United States of America

Coordinates: 38°02′21″N 119°40′46″W

Highest point
- Elevation: 2,602 m (8,537 ft)

Geography
- Location: Tuolumne County

Andrews Peak is a summit in Tuolumne County, California, in the United States. With an elevation of 8,537 feet (2,602 m), Andrews Peak is the 880th highest summit in the state of California.

Andrews Peak was named for Professor George Leonard Andrews of West Point.
