= Haines Mountains =

Mountain range in Marie Byrd Land, Antarctica

- Location within Antarctica

Highest point
- Elevation: 675 m (2,215 ft)

Geography
- Range coordinates: 77°34′S 146°20′W
- Parent range: Ford Ranges

The Haines Mountains (77°34′S 146°20′W) are a range of ice-capped mountains trending northwest–southeast for about 25 nautical miles (46 km; 29 mi) and forming the southwest wall of Hammond Glacier, in the Ford Ranges of Marie Byrd Land, Antarctica.

== Location ==
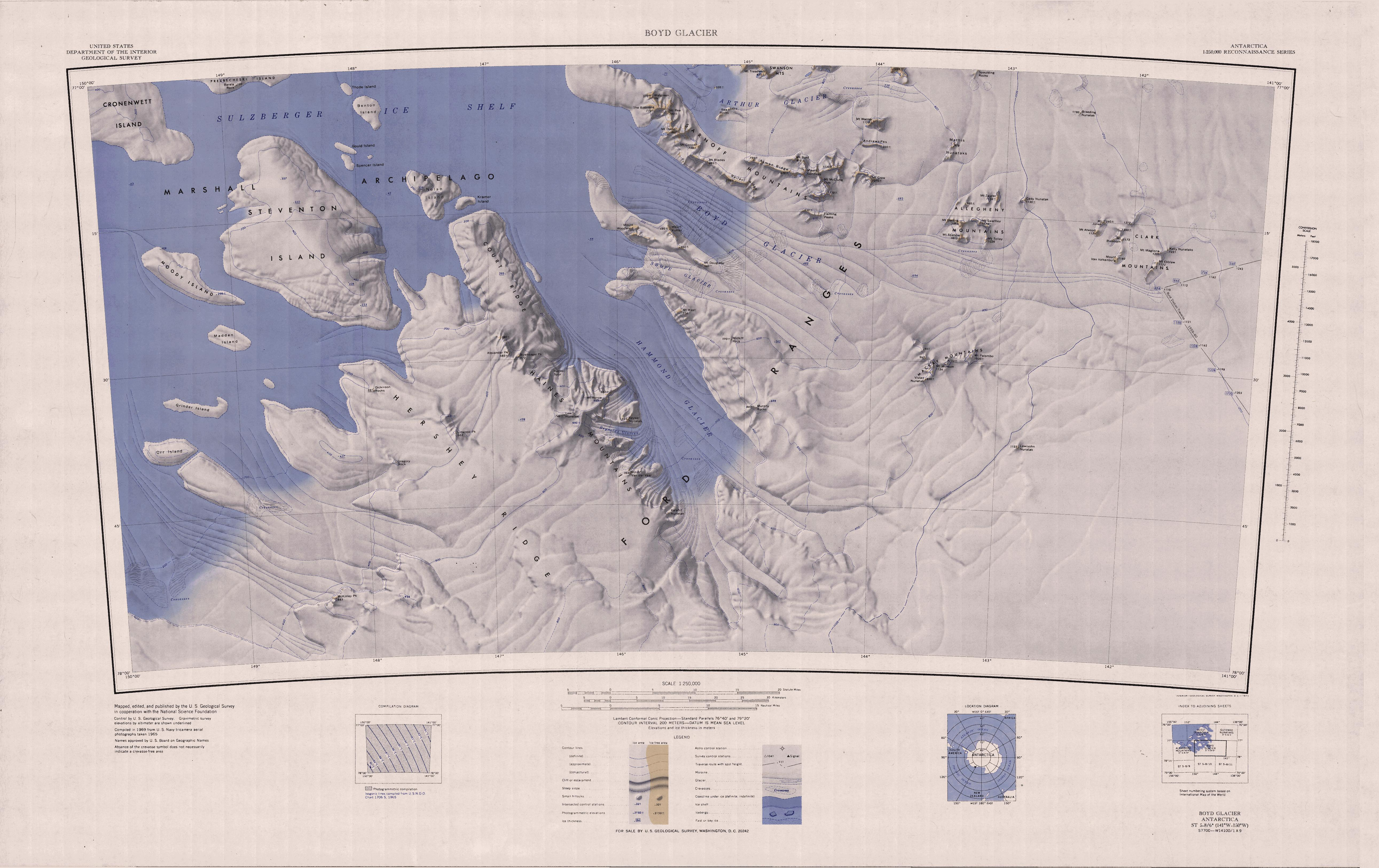
Haines Mountains east of center of the map

The Haines Mountains run southeast from Court Ridge, which extends into the Sulzberger Ice Shelf along the side of the Hammond Glacier to the head of the glacier. They are parallel to the Hershey Ridge, which lies to the west. Features, from north to south, include Alexander Peak, Buennagel Peak, Rucker Spur, Mount Ronne, Leach Nunatak, Keyser Nunatak, Reynolds Glacier, Mount Van der Veer and Kalafut Nunatak. Nearby features, on the east side of Hammond Glacier, include Mount West, Midkiff Rock and Murphy Rocks.

== Discovery and name ==
The Haines Mountains were discovered by the Byrd Antarctic Expedition (ByrdAE) in 1934, and named for William C. Haines, the meteorologist of the Byrd expeditions of 1928–30 and 1933–35.

== Features ==
=== Alexander Peak ===
77°28′S 146°48′W. A peak in the north end of the Haines Mountains. Probably first seen on aerial flights from Little America base by the ByrdAE (1928-30). Named by the United States Advisory Committee on Antarctic Names (US-ACAN) for C.D. Alexander, a member of the ByrdAE (1933-35).

=== Buennagel Peak ===
77°30′S 146°46′W. A rock peak 1 nautical mile (1.9 km; 1.2 mi) east of Alexander Peak in the north part of Haines Mountains. Mapped by the United States Antarctic Service (USAS) (1939–41) and by the United States Geological Survey (USGS) from surveys and United States Navy air photos (1959-65). Named by US-ACAN for Lawrence A. Buennagel, geomagnetist/seismologist at Byrd Station, 1968.

=== Rucker Spur ===
77°31′S 146°30′W. A rock spur between Alexander Peak and Mount Ronne, on the east side of the Haines Mountains. Mapped by the USAS (1939-41). Named by US-ACAN for Joseph T. Rucker, photographer with the ByrdAE (1928-30).

=== Mount Ronne ===
77°34′S 146°10′W. A prominent, flattish mountain which projects from the middle of the east side of the Haines Mountains. The mountain was probably first observed on aerial flights by the ByrdAE (1928-30). Named by US-ACAN for Martin Ronne who was sailmaker, ski instructor, dog-driver and ice pilot with the ByrdAE (1928-30), and who had been a shipboard member of the From on Amundsen's expedition (1910-12).

=== Leach Nunatak ===
77°36′S 146°25′W. A nunatak 4 nautical miles (7.4 km; 4.6 mi) west-southwest of Mount Ronne. Mapped by USAS (1939-41) and by USGS from surveys and United States Navy air photos (1959-65). Named by US-ACAN for Edwin B. Leach, aviation electronics technician, United States Navy, Williams Field Division Chief responsible for maintenance of electronic equipment on all aircraft during Operation Deep Freeze 1967.

=== Keyser Nunatak ===
77°36′S 145°55′W. A large nunatak 605 metres (1,985 ft) high at the north side of the terminus of Reynolds Glacier. Mapped by USAS (1939–41) and by USGS from surveys and United States Navy air photos (1959-65). Named by US-ACAN for Lieutenant (j-g.) Teddy H. Keyser, United States Navy, navigator in LC-130F Hercules aircraft during Operation Deep Freeze 1968.

=== Mount Van der Veer ===
77°41′S 145°54′W. (Note: Alberts 1995 gives the coordinates of Mount Van der Veer as 76°41'S,145°54'W. Based on the map and the description, this appears to be a typo that places the mountain a full degree north, and the correct coordinates are 77°41'S,145°54'W.) A mountain about 8 nautical miles (15 km; 9.2 mi) southeast of Mount Ronne. Mapped by the USAS (1939-41). Named by US-ACAN for Willard Van der Veer, photographer with the ByrdAE (1928-30).

=== Kalafut Nunatak ===
77°46′S 145°36′W. A nunatak which marks the southeast end of the Haines Mountains. Mapped by USAS (1939–41) and by USGS from surveys and United States Navy air photos (1959-65). Named by US-ACAN for John Kalafut, USARP glaciologist at Byrd Station in the 1966-67 and 1968-69 seasons.

== Nearby features ==
=== Court Ridge ===
77°20′S 146°52′W. Low, ice-drowned ridge extending to Sulzberger Ice Shelf from the northwest extremity of the Haines Mountains. Discovered by members of the ByrdAE on the Northeast Flight of 15-16 December 1934. Named for Arnold Court, meteorologist at the West Base of the USAS (1939-41).

=== Mount West ===
77°25′S 145°30′W. A somewhat isolated mountain 9 nautical miles (17 km; 10 mi) southeast of Mount Woodward, surmounting the ice-covered ridge between Hammond Glacier and Swope Glacier. Mapped by the USAS, 1939–41. The name was applied by Paul Siple, commander of the West Base of the USAS, for James E. West, the first Chief Scout Executive of the Boy Scouts of America. Siple's first visit to Antarctica was as a member of the ByrdAE (1928-30), having been selected as an Eagle Scout for that venture.

=== Midkiff Rock ===
77°28′S 145°06′W. A rock outcrop on the broad ice-covered ridge between Hammond and Swope Glaciers, 6 nautical miles (11 km; 6.9 mi) east-southeast of Mount West. Mapped by USAS (1939-41) and by USGS from surveys and United States Navy air photos (1959-65). Named by US-ACAN for Frank T. Midkiff, Jr., aviation machinist's mate, United States Navy, helicopter flight crewman during Operation Deep Freeze 1968.

=== Murphy Rocks ===
77°35′S 144°55′W. Rock outcrops 12 nautical miles (22 km; 14 mi) southeast of Mount West on the broad ice-covered ridge between the Hammond and Boyd Glaciers. Mapped by USAS (1939-41) and by USGS from surveys and United States Navy air photos (1959-65). Named by US-ACAN for Dion M. Murphy, aviation machinist's mate, United States Navy, a helicopter flight crewman during Operation Deep Freeze 1968.

== Sources ==
- Alberts, Fred G., ed. (1995), Geographic Names of the Antarctic (PDF) (2 ed.), United States Board on Geographic Names This article incorporates public domain material from websites or documents of the United States Board on Geographic Names.
- Boyd Glacier, USGS: United States Geological Survey
- This article incorporates public domain material from websites or documents of the United States Geological Survey.
