= Justice Andrews =

Justice Andrews may refer to:

- Charles Andrews (New York judge) (1827–1918), chief judge of the New York Court of Appeals
- George Andrews (judge) (1826–1889), justice of the Tennessee Supreme Court
- Harold A. Andrews (1889–1958), justice of the Rhode Island Supreme Court
- Lorrin Andrews (1795–1868), justice of the Supreme Court of Hawaii
- Richard Bullock Andrews (1823–1884), justice of the Supreme Court of South Australia
- Thomas G. Andrews (judge) (1892–1942), justice of the Oklahoma Supreme Court
- William Drennan Andrews (1832–1924), judge of the High Court of Justice in Ireland
- William Shankland Andrews (1858–1936), judge of the New York Court of Appeals

== See also ==
- Judge Andrews (disambiguation)
- Andrew Justice (1951–2005), British rower
