= Murphy Rocks, Australian Antarctic Territory =

Murphy Rocks
- Location within Antarctica

Geography
- Location: Antarctica
- Coordinates: 68°13′54.7″S 78°43′55.5″E

Administration
- Administered under the Antarctic Treaty System

Demographics
- Population: Uninhabited

Murphy Rocks consists of two closely adjacent but very isolated rocks lying in the sea about 2.3 kilometres (1.4 mi) off the ice-cliff coastline of the Ingrid Christensen Coast, Princess Elizabeth Land, in the Vestfold Hills region of Antarctica. The rocks are dark grey and rounded, with diameters of about 200 metres (660 ft) and are located approximately 49.5 kilometres (30.8 mi) north-east of Davis Station. In January 1979 the first landings were made by helicopter on these rocks, during which survey station NM/S/268 was established.

The rocks are named for Brian Murphy, who made extensive surveys in the Vestfold Hills in 1978–79, including Doppler satellite fixes, a Tellurometer survey, heights by simultaneous reciprocal vertical angles and a site survey for a major re-building of Davis Station.

These rocks currently define the northeasternmost limit of ice-free rock areas of the Ingrid Christensen Coast, Princess Elizabeth Land, and, as such, form part of an extensive network of Adelie penguin rookeries located along this section of the coastline of Antarctica.

The summit of the southernmost rock, upon which Transit Doppler satellite survey station NM/S/268 was established in January, 1979, and to which the above WGS84 coordinates refer, is 22.4 metres (73 ft) above mean sea level. The summit of the northernmost rock, upon which survey station NM/S/270 was established, is 23.8 metres (78 ft) above mean sea level. Survey station NM/S/270 lies on a true bearing of 75° 49' distant 191.61 metres (628.6 ft) from survey station NM/S/268.
