= Sarnoff Mountains =

Mountain range in Antarctica

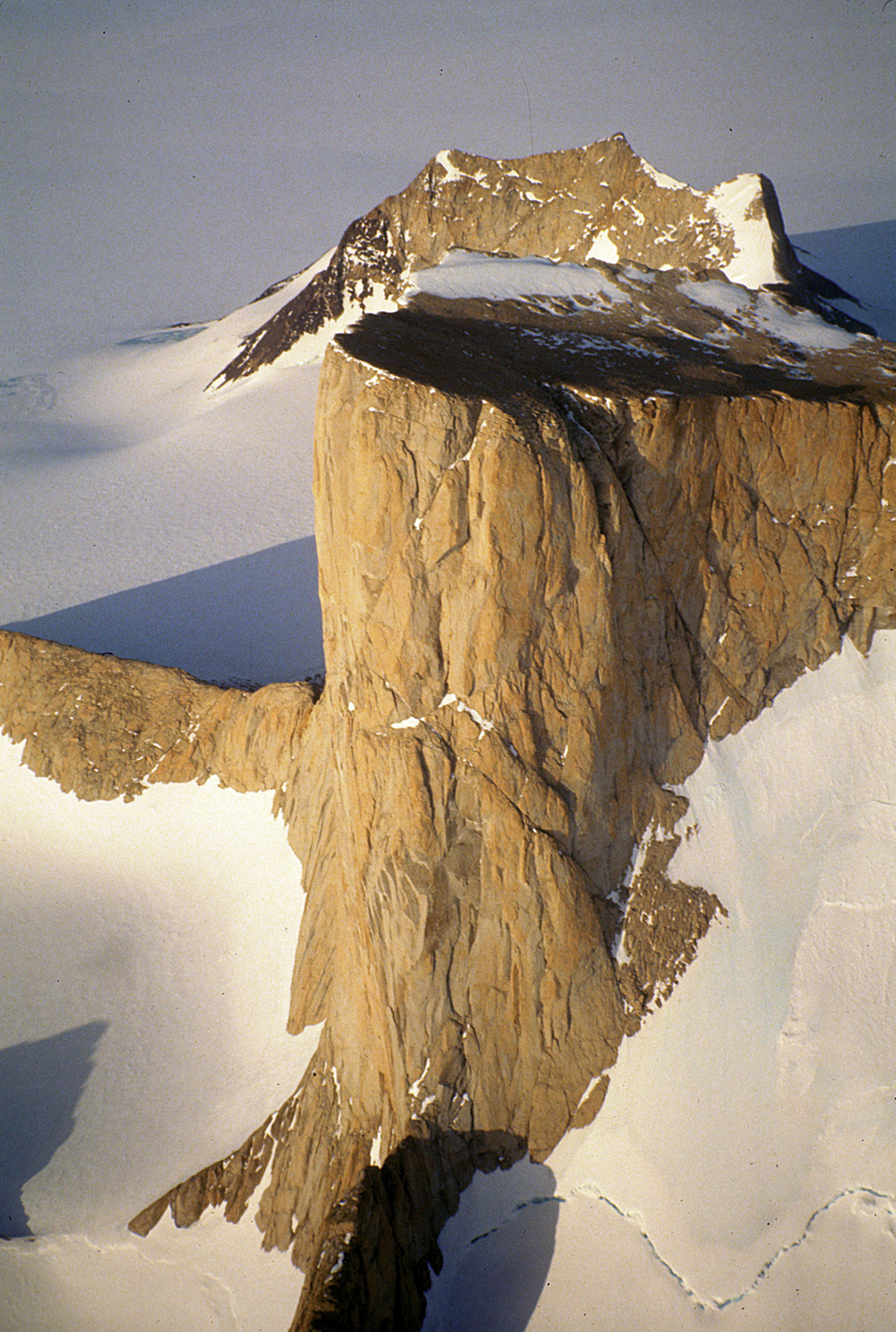
- The Billboard, on the west side of Mount Rea

Highest point
- Elevation: 412 m (1,352 ft)

Dimensions
- Length: 25 nautical miles (46 km)
- Width: 4–8 nautical miles (7,400–14,800 m)

Geography
- Location within Antarctica
- Continent: Antarctica
- Area: Marie Byrd Land
- Range coordinates: 77°10′S 145°0′W
- Parent range: Ford Ranges

Climbing
- First ascent: Byrd Antarctic Expedition (1933-35)

Sarnoff Mountains (77°10′S 145°0′W) is a range of mountains, 251 nautical miles (465 km; 289 mi) long and 4 to 8 nautical miles (7.4 to 14.8 km; 4.6 to 9.2 mi) wide separating the west-flowing Boyd Glacier and Arthur Glacier in the Ford Ranges of Marie Byrd Land, Antarctica.

== Location ==
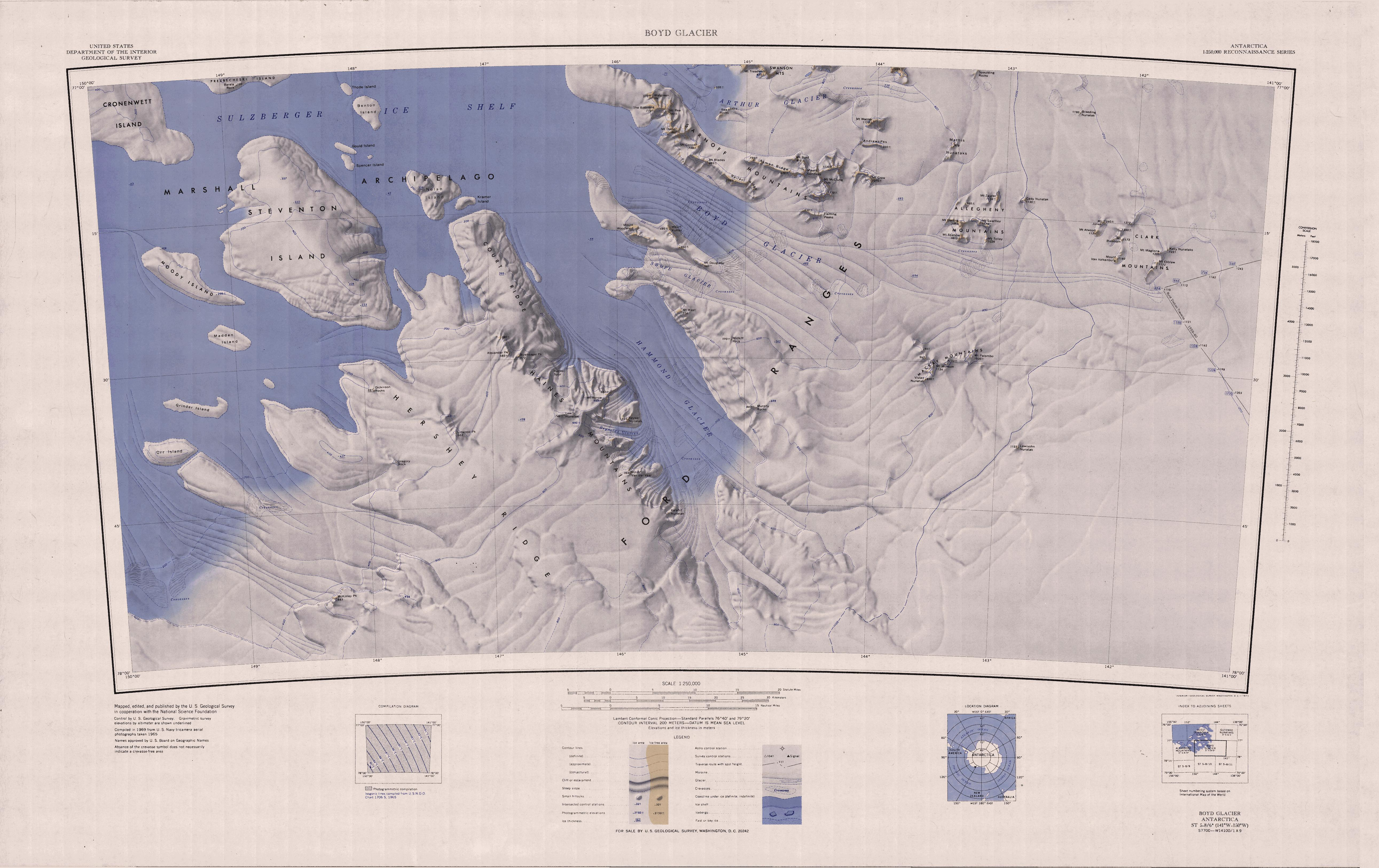
Sarnoff Mountains in the center of the north of the map

The Sarnoff Mountains are in the Ford Ranges. They run in a northwest direction between Boyd Glacier to the southwest and Arthur Glacier to the north. Features include, from northwest to southeast, Walgreen Peak, The Billboard, Mount Rea, Mount Dolber, Mount Cooper, Mount Blades, Bailey Ridge, Asman Ridge, Mount Byrd, Mount Gonzáles, Mount McClung, Fleming Peaks and Mount Crow. Nearby features on the west side of Boyd Glacier include Mount Woodward, Mount Kohler and Mount Douglass. Nearby features to the north include Rea Rocks, Mount Warner and Andrews Peaks.

== Discovery and name ==
The west end of the range was discovered and roughly plotted from photographs taken by the Byrd Antarctic Expedition (ByrdAE; 1928–30) on the flight of December 5, 1929. The range was mapped in greater detail by the Byrd Antarctic Expedition (1933–35) and United States Antarctic Service (USAS) (1939–41), all expeditions led by R. Admiral Richard E. Byrd. It was named for David Sarnoff, president of RCA (Radio Corporation of America), who provided radio equipment for receiving and transmitting that was used in the field and at Little America by the Byrd Antarctic Expedition (1933–35).

== Features ==
=== Walgreen Peak ===
77°03′S 145°43′W. A prominent rock peak 570 metres (1,870 ft) high which forms the northwest extremity of the Sarnoff Mountains. Mapped by the United States Antarctic Service (USAS) (1939-41) led by Rear Admiral Richard E. Byrd. Named for Charles Rudolph Walgreen Jr., vice president of The Walgreen Company, 1933-39 (later chairman of the board), who contributed malted milk powder used on the USAS (1939-41).

=== The Billboard ===
77°04′S 145°40′W. A massive granite monolith with vertical faces rising more than 300 metres (980 ft) high above the continental ice, standing just west of Mount Rea between Arthur and Boyd Glaciers. Discovered in November 1934 by the ByrdAE sledge party under Paul Siple, and so named because of its form and appearance.

=== Mount Rea ===
77°04′31″S 145°36′10″W. Prominent rock mountain with an imposing monolith on its west side called The Billboard, standing between Arthur Glacier and Boyd Glacier. Discovered by the ByrdAE on the Eastern Flight of December 5, 1929, and named by Byrd for Mr. and Mrs. Rea, of Pittsburgh, PA, contributors to the expedition.

=== Mount Dolber ===
77°07′S 145°31′W. A prominent mountain 865 metres (2,838 ft) high with a large snow-free summit, located between Mount Rea and Mount Cooper. Mapped by the USAS (1939-41) and by the United States Geological Survey (USGS) from surveys and United States Navy air photos (1959-65). Named by the United States Advisory Committee on Antarctic Names (US-ACAN) for Captain Sumner R. Dolber, USCG, captain of the icebreaker Southwind in the Antarctic Peninsula Ship Group (1967-68) and the Ross Sea Ship Group (1968-69).

=== Mount Cooper ===
77°08′S 145°22′W. A large mountain standing 4 nautical miles (7.4 km; 4.6 mi) west of Asman Ridge on the south side of Arthur Glacier. Discovered on aerial flights in 1934 by the ByrdAE, and named by Byrd for Merian C. Cooper, motion picture producer of Hollywood.

=== Mount Blades ===
77°10′S 145°15′W. A mountain 3 nautical miles (5.6 km; 3.5 mi) west-northwest of Bailey Ridge, on the north side of Boyd Glacier. Discovered and mapped by the USAS (1932-41). Named by US-ACAN for Commander J.L. Blades, United States Navy, in charge of Antarctic support activities at McMurdo Station during the winter of 1965.

=== Bailey Ridge ===
77°12′S 145°02′W. A serrate ridge 4 nautical miles (7.4 km; 4.6 mi) long, standing between Mount Blades and Fleming Peaks. Discovered on aerial flights of the ByrdAE in 1934, and named by the USAS (1939-41) for Clay W. Bailey, a member of both expeditions.

=== Asman Ridge ===
77°10′S 144°48′W. A serrate ridge about 6 nautical miles (11 km; 6.9 mi) long on the south side of Arthur Glacier, just north of Bailey Ridge. Discovered in 1934 on aerial flights of the ByrdAE. Named by the USAS (1939–41) for Adam Asman, a member of the USAS West Base party.

=== Mount Byrd ===
77°10′S 144°38′W. A mountain 810 metres (2,660 ft) high located 1 nautical mile (1.9 km; 1.2 mi) north of the east end of Asman Ridge. Mapped by the USAS (1939–41) led by Rear Admiral Richard E. Byrd. Named by US-ACAN for Richard E. Byrd, Jr., son of Admiral Byrd and a member of Operation Highjump (1946-47), who was of assistance to US-ACAN in clarifying a large number of name suggestions put forth by his father.

=== Mount González ===
77°11′S 144°33′W. A prominent mountain 1 nautical mile (1.9 km; 1.2 mi) east of Asman Ridge. Mapped by USAS (1939-41) and by USGS from surveys and United States Navy air photos (1959-65). Named by US-ACAN after Oscar González, geologist, Universidad de Chile, a member of the United States Antarctic Research Program (USARP) Marie Byrd Land Survey 11, 1967-68.

=== Mount Stagnaro ===
77°10′S 144°20′W. A mountain 1,130 metres (3,710 ft) high located 3 nautical miles (5.6 km; 3.5 mi) east-northeast of Mount Gonzalez. The mountain was surveyed and mapped by the US AS, 1939-41. Named by US-ACAN in 1980 after John Stagnaro of La Crescenta, California, who during the 1970's carried out nightly Ham radio schedules with the South Pole Station, McMurdo Station, Palmer Station and Siple Station, connecting personnel at isolated research stations with family and friends in the United States. The ham radio patches provided by "Big John" over many years were a significant factor in maintaining high morale at these stations.

=== Mount McClung ===
77°11′S 144°26′W. A mountain 2 nautical miles (3.7 km; 2.3 mi) southeast of Mount Gonzdlez. Discovered and mapped by the USAS (1939–41). Named by US-ACAN after Lieutenant Herbert C. McClung, MC, United States Navy, officer in charge at Byrd Station, 1965.

=== Fleming Peaks ===
77°15′S 144°30′W. A small group of peaks 6 nautical miles (11 km; 6.9 mi) east-southeast of Bailey Ridge, on the north side of Boyd Glacier. Discovered and mapped by the USAS (1939–41). Named by US-ACAN for Bernard Fleming, an assistant to the scientific staff on the ByrdAE (1933-35).

=== Mount Crow ===
77°11′S 144°04′W. A mountain just east of Mount McClung. Discovered and mapped by the USAS (1939–41). Named by US-ACAN for Lieutenant J.L. Crow, MC, United States Navy, officer in charge at Byrd Station, 1963.

== Nearby features ==
=== Mount Woodward ===
77°18′S 145°47′W. Mountain with broad twin summits standing between Hammond Glacier and Boyd Glacier, 6 nautical miles (11 km; 6.9 mi) west-northwest of Mount Douglass. Discovered by the ByrdAE (1928-30) and named for Donald Woodward, a patron of the expedition.

=== Mount Kohler ===
77°17′S 145°35′W. A mountain 480 metres (1,570 ft) high on the south side of Boyd Glacier, 4 nautical miles (7.4 km; 4.6 mi) east of Mount Woodward. Mapped by USAS (1939–41) led by R. Admiral R.E. Byrd. Named for Herbert V. Kohler, Jr., and Ruth DeYoung Kohler II, son and daughter of Herbert V. Kohler, financial contributors to the ByrdAE, 1933-35.

=== Mount Douglass ===
77°20′S 145°20′W. Ice-covered mountain 8 nautical miles (15 km; 9.2 mi) east-southeast of Mount Woodward on the south side of Boyd Glacier. Discovered in 1934 on aerial flights of the ByrdAE. Named for Malcolm C. Douglass, dog driver at West Base of the USAS (1939–41).

=== Rea Rocks ===
77°05′S 145°10′W. A group of rocks in the middle of Arthur Glacier, 6 nautical miles (11 km; 6.9 mi) east of Mount Rea. Mapped by USGS from surveys and United States Navy air photos, 1959-65. Named by US-ACAN for construction electrician Peter C. Rea, United States Navy, of the Byrd Station, 1967.

=== Mount Warner ===
77°05′S 144°00′W. An isolated mountain just south of the head of Arthur Glacier and 5 nautical miles (9.3 km; 5.8 mi) north of Mount Crow. Discovered by members of a geological party of the USAS (1939-41) and named for Lawrence A. Warner, geologist at the USAS West Base and leader of the party which visited this mountain.

=== Andrews Peaks ===
77°08′S 144°03′W. A line of rock peaks 3 nautical miles (5.6 km; 3.5 mi) long near the head of Arthur Glacier, situated between Mount Warner and Mount Crow. Mapped by USAS (1939–41) and by USGS from surveys and United States Navy air photos (1959-65). Named by US-ACAN for Stephen T. Andrews, USARP ionospheric physicist, scientific leader at Byrd Station in 1969.

== Sources ==
- Alberts, Fred G., ed. (1995), Geographic Names of the Antarctic (PDF) (2 ed.), United States Board on Geographic Names This article incorporates public domain material from websites or documents of the United States Board on Geographic Names.
- Boyd Glacier, USGS: United States Geological Survey
- This article incorporates public domain material from websites or documents of the United States Geological Survey.
