= Sulzberger Ice Shelf =

Ice shelf in Antarctica

- Ice shelf
- Location within Antarctica
- Coordinates: 77°00′S 148°00′W
- Location: Marie Byrd Land, Antarctica
- Water bodies: Southern Ocean

Sulzberger Ice Shelf (77°00′S 148°00′W) is an ice shelf about 85 nautical miles (157 km; 98 mi) long and 50 nautical miles (93 km; 58 mi) wide bordering the coast of Marie Byrd Land between Edward VII Peninsula and Guest Peninsula in Antarctica.

== Exploration and name ==
The Sulzberger Ice Shelf was observed and roughly mapped by the Byrd Antarctic Expedition (ByrdAE; 1928–30), which applied the name Sulzberger Bay to the open water indenting this feature. The United States Advisory Committee on Antarctic Names (US-ACAN) extended the name Sulzberger to the adjacent ice shelf.

== Location ==
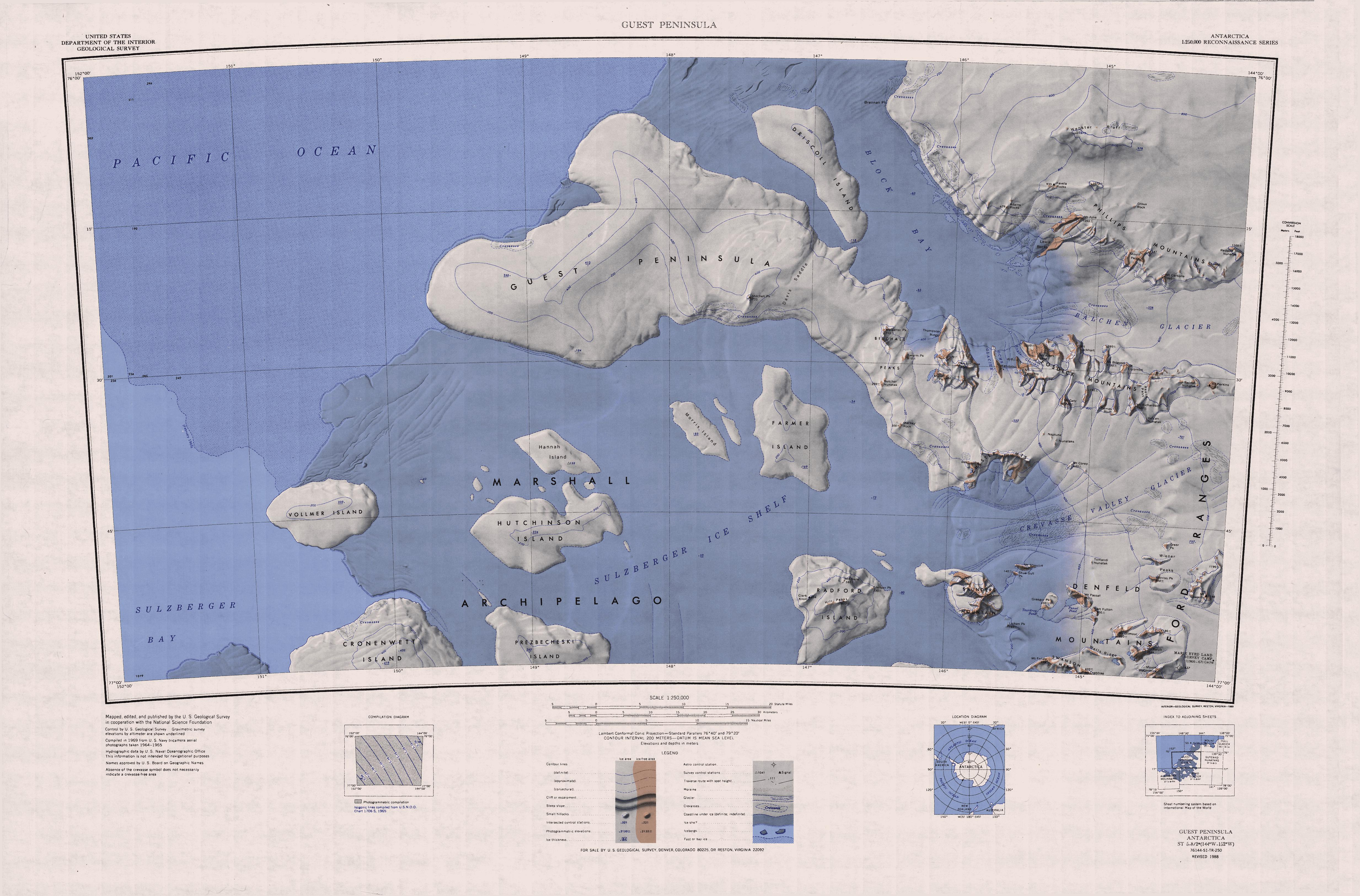
Northern part of ice shelf

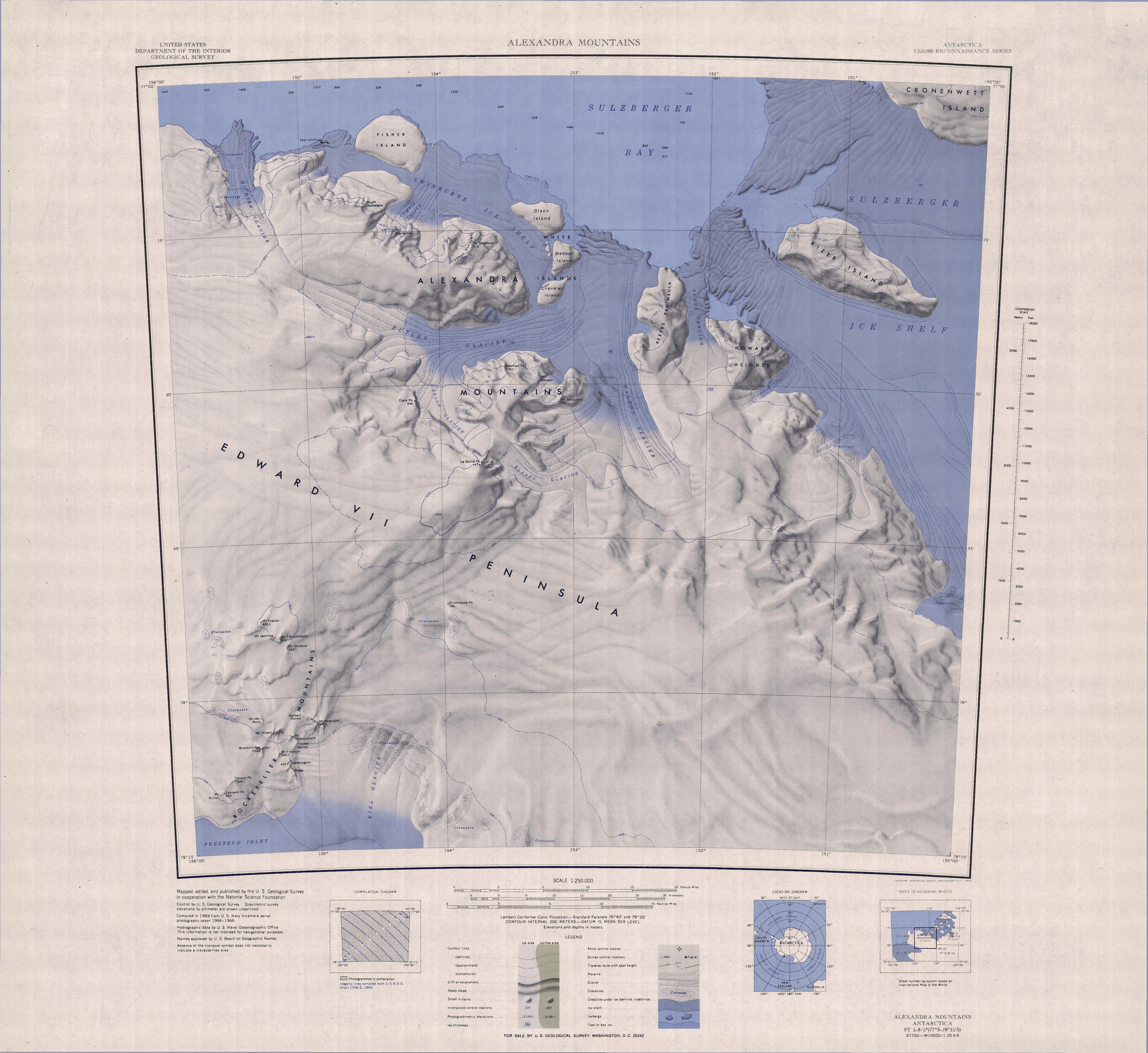
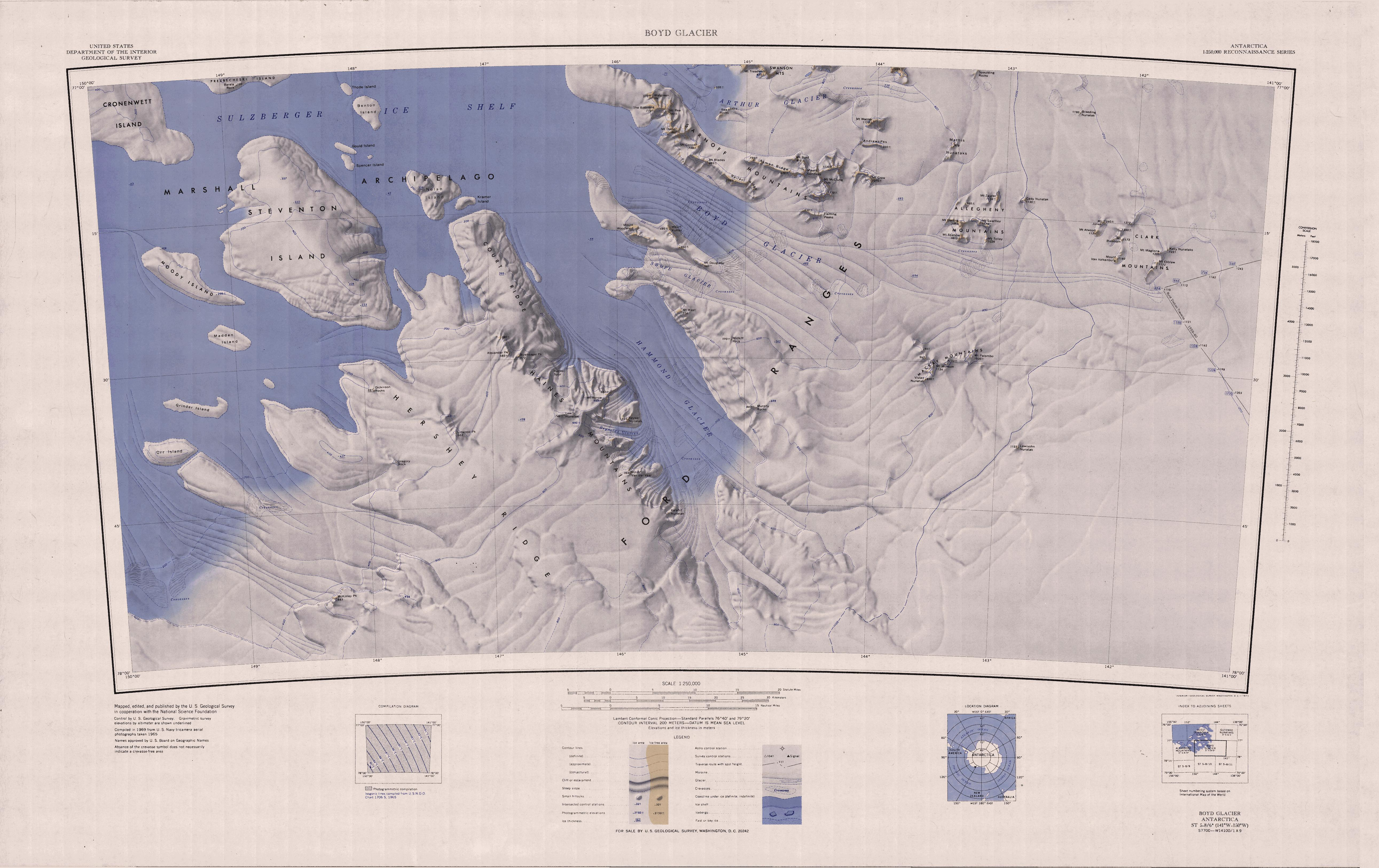
Southern part of ice shelf

The landward side of the Sulzberger Ice Shelf extends southeast from Howard Heights and the mouth of the Stewart Glacier to McKinley Peak. From there it runs northeast past the Hershey Ridge and the Court Ridge, past the mouths of the Hammond Glacier, Swope Glacier, Boyd Glacier and Arthur Glacier to the Denfeld Mountains. It then runs north past the mouth of the Crevasse Valley Glacier and northwest along the southern edge of the Guest Peninsula. The seaward side extends in a generally northeast direction from the tip of the Reeves Peninsula to the tip of the Guest Peninsula. The seaward side forms the shore of Sulzberger Bay. The islands of the Marshall Archipelago are scattered throughout the ice shelf.

== Features ==
=== Howard Heights ===
77°27′S 151°40′W. A snow covered coastal promontory 515 metres (1,690 ft) high between Stewart Glacier and Gerry Glacier on the north side of Edward VII Peninsula. Features in this area were explored by the ByrdAE, 1928–30 and 1933–35. These heights were mapped by the United States Geological Survey (USGS) from surveys and United States Navy air photos, 1959–65. Named by US-ACAN (at the suggestion of Admiral Richard E. Byrd) for Roy W. Howard of the ScrippsHoward newspapers, who made financial contributions to the ByrdAE, 1933–35.

=== Stewart Glacier ===
77°29′S 151°25′W. A glacier on the north side of Edward VII Peninsula, flowing northeast along, the east side of Howard Heights into Sulzberger Ice Shelf. Mapped by USGS from surveys and United States Navy air photos, 1959–65. Named by US-ACAN for Lieutenant Commander Wayne B. Stewart, United States Navy, co-pilot in LC-130F Hercules aircraft during Operation Deep Freeze 1968.

=== McKinley Peak ===
77°54′S 148°18′W. A peak standing 15 nautical miles (28 km; 17 mi) west of Hershey Ridge at the south end of the Ford Ranges. Discovered on the ByrdAE flight of December 5, 1929. Named by Byrd for Grace McKinley, wife of Captain Ashley C. McKinley, aerial photographer and third in command of the expedition.

=== Hammond Glacier ===
77°25′S 146°00′W. Glacier on the northeast side of the Haines Mountains, flowing northwest for about 40 nautical miles (74 km; 46 mi) to Sulzberger Ice Shelf in the Ford Ranges. Discovered in 1934 by the ByrdAE, and named by Byrd for John Hays Hammond, American mining engineer and philanthropist.

=== Reynolds Glacier ===
77°38′S 145°55′W. A glacier 5 nautical miles (9.3 km; 5.8 mi) long, flowing eastward from the Haines Mountains along the south side of Keyser Nunatak to enter the Hammond Glacier. Mapped by USGS from surveys and United States Navy air photos, 1959–65. Named by US-ACAN for Donald K. Reynolds, ionospheric physicist at Byrd Station, 1967–68 season.

=== Swope Glacier ===
77°20′S 145°50′W. A glacier which drains westward from the Ford Ranges, between Mount Woodward and Mount West, into Sulzberger Ice Shelf. Features in these ranges were discovered and successively mapped by the ByrdAE (1928–30) and (1933–35) and by the USAS (1939–41) all led by R. Admiral R.E. Byrd. The glacier is named for Gerard Swope, president of General Electric, who contributed various types of electrical equipment to the ByrdAE (1933–35).

=== Boyd Glacier ===
77°14′S 145°25′W. Heavily crevassed glacier flowing west-northwest for about 45 nautical miles (83 km; 52 mi) to the Sulzberger Ice Shelf between Bailey Ridge and Mount Douglass in the Ford Ranges. Discovered on aerial flights of the ByrdAE in 1934, and named for Vernon D. Boyd, expedition machinist, and a member of West Base of the USAS (1939–41).

=== Arthur Glacier ===
77°03′S 145°15′W. Valley glacier about 25 nautical miles (46 km; 29 mi) long, flowing west to Sulzberger Ice Shelf between the Swanson Mountains on the north and Mount Rea and Mount Cooper on the south, in the Ford Ranges. Discovered by members of West Base of the US AS, in aerial flights and from ground surveys in November–December 1940. Named by US-SCAN for R. Admiral Arthur C. Davis, United States Navy, a leader in aviation in the United States Navy.

=== Crevasse Valley Glacier ===
76°46′S 145°30′W. A broad glacier about 30 nautical miles (56 km; 35 mi) long, flowing west-southwest between Chester Mountains and Saunders Mountain. Discovered by a sledging party of the ByrdAE, which visited this area in November–December 1934, and so named because of its extensively crevassed surface.

== Sources ==
- Alberts, Fred G., ed. (1995), Geographic Names of the Antarctic (PDF) (2 ed.), United States Board on Geographic Names This article incorporates public domain material from websites or documents of the United States Board on Geographic Names.
- Alexandra Mountains, USGS: United States Geological Survey
- Boyd Glacier, USGS: United States Geological Survey
- Guest Peninsula, USGS: United States Geological Survey
- This article incorporates public domain material from websites or documents of the United States Geological Survey.
