= Smith Glacier =

Glacier in Marie Byrd Land, Antarctica

- Location within Antarctica
- Location: Marie Byrd Land, Antarctica
- Coordinates: 75°05′S 112°00′W

Smith Glacier (75°05′S 112°00′W is a low-gradient Antarctic glacier, over 160 km (100 mi) long, draining from Toney Mountain in an ENE direction to Amundsen Sea. A northern distributary, Kohler Glacier, drains to Dotson Ice Shelf but the main flow passes to the sea between Bear Peninsula and Mount Murphy, terminating at Crosson Ice Shelf.

== Location ==
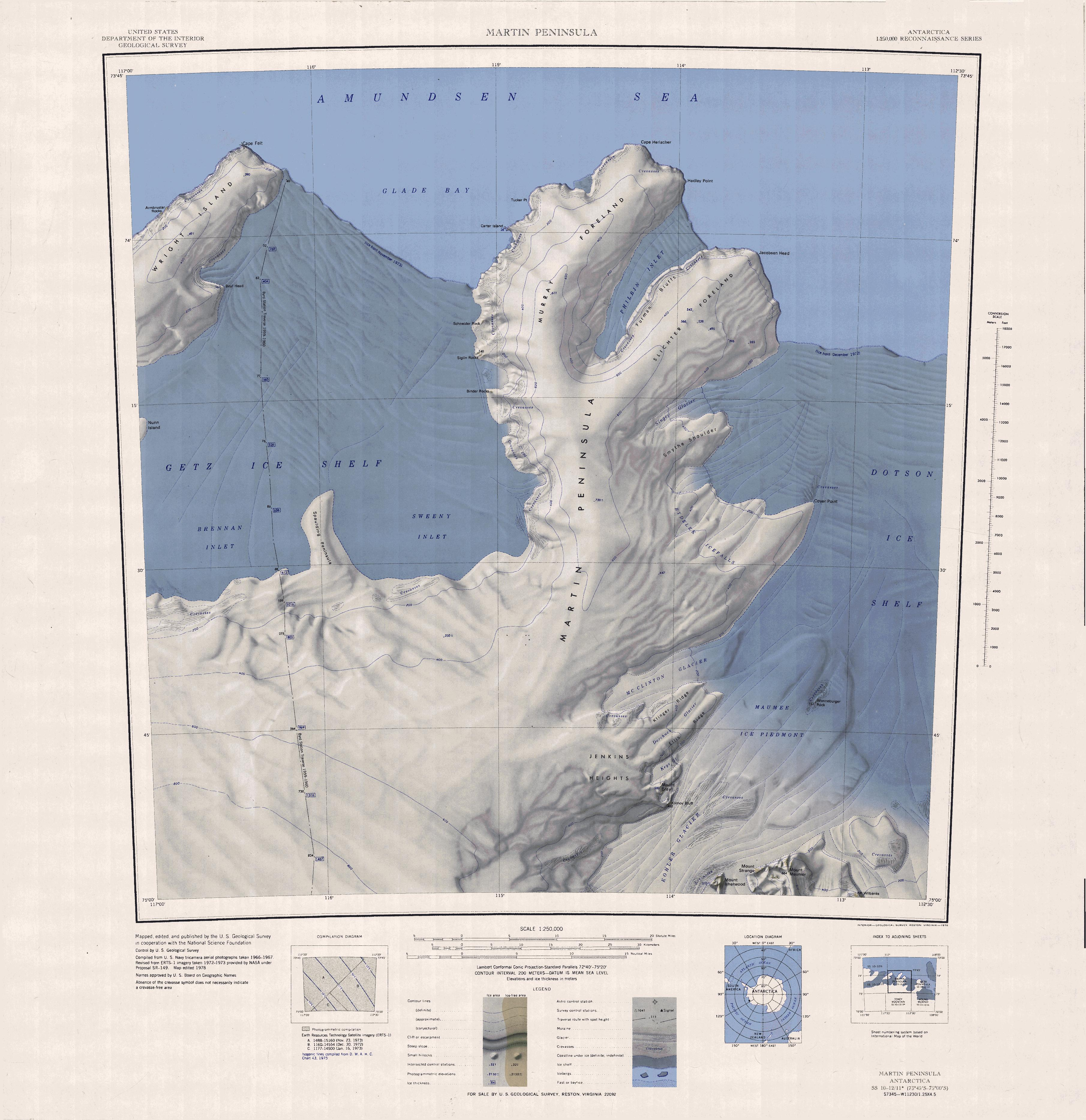
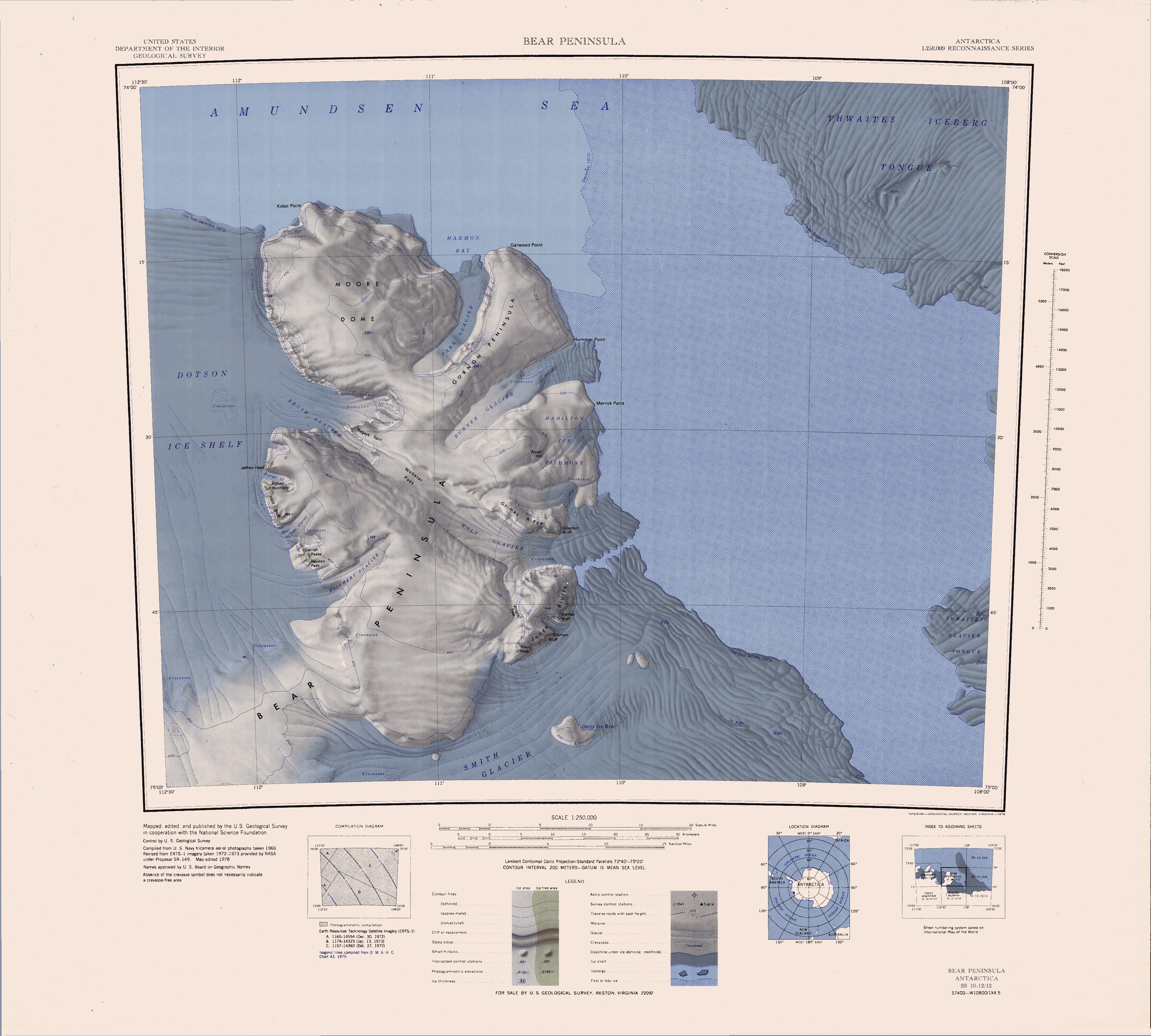

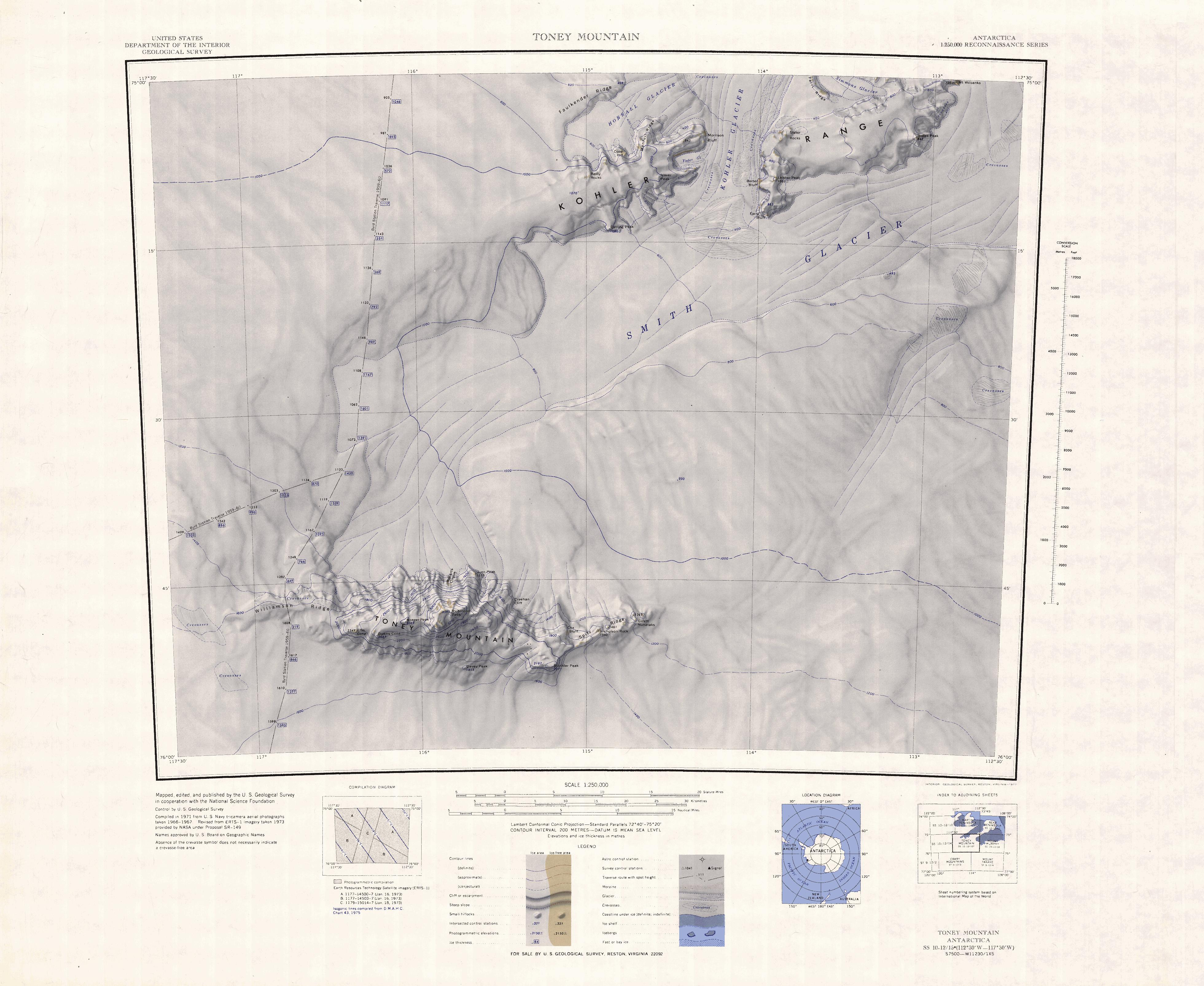
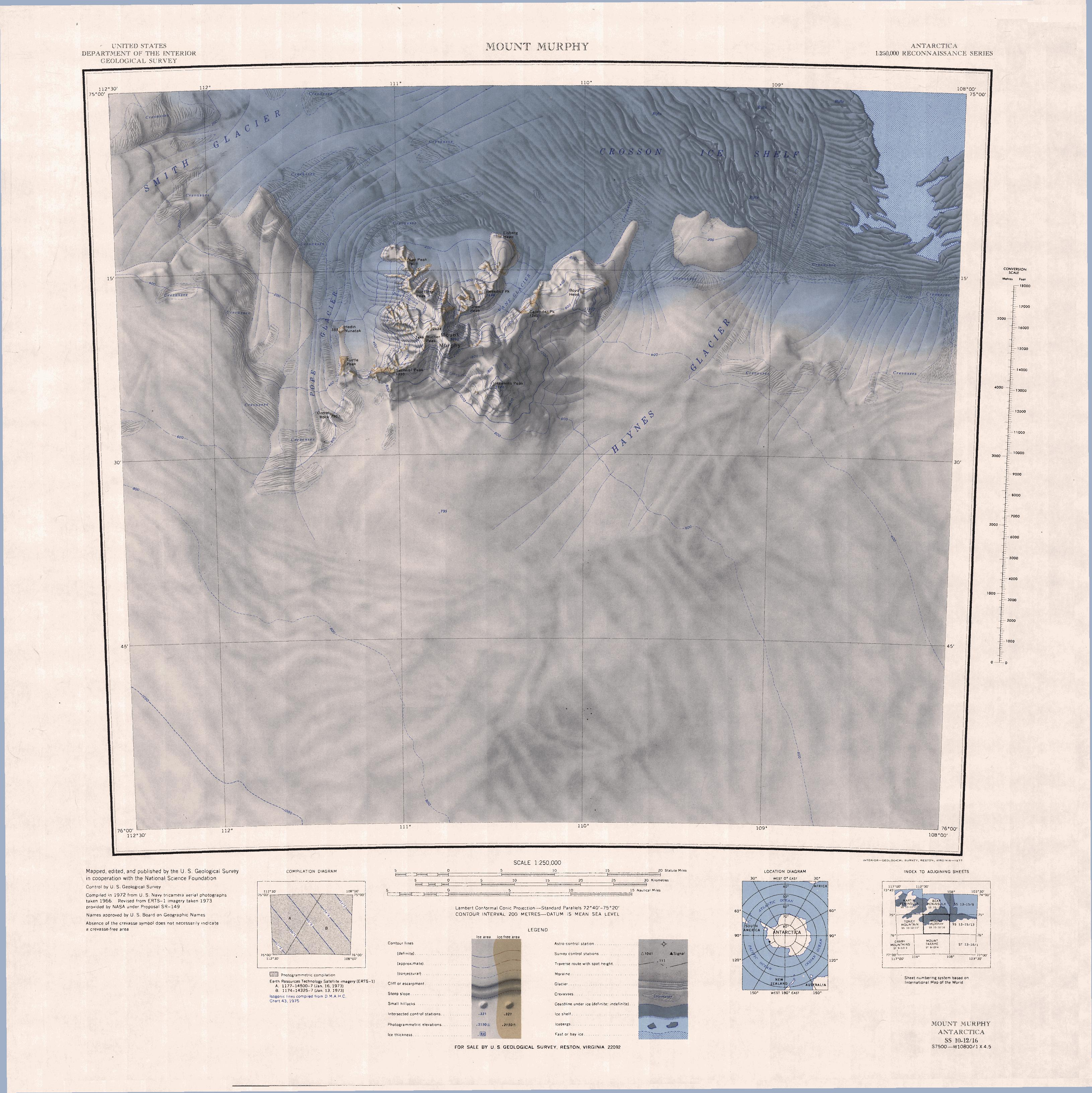
Smith Glacier runs from southwest to northeast

The Smith Glacier originates on the north slopes of Toney Mountain, and flows northeast past the Kohler Range. The Kohler Glacier, a distributary, splits off from the Smith Glacier and flows north into the Maumee Ice Piedmont and the Dotson Ice Shelf to the west of the Bear Peninsula. The main Smith Glacier flows past the southeast of the Bear Peninsula, past the Davis Ice Rise, to the Amundsen Sea.

=== Davis Ice Rise ===
74°56′S 110°18′W. An ice rise, 4 nautical miles (7.4 km; 4.6 mi) long, near the terminus of Smith Glacier, 8 nautical miles (15 km; 9.2 mi) southeast of Mayo Peak, Bear Peninsulat. Mapped by USGS from USN aerial photographs taken 1966 and Landsat imagery taken 1972-73. Named by US-ACAN after Commander Arthur R. Davis, USN, Supply Officer, Operation Deep Freeze, 1975-76 and 1976-77.

== Mapping and name ==
The Smith Glacier was mapped by United States Geological Survey (USGS) from ground surveys and United States Navy air photos, 1959–65. It was named by the United States Advisory Committee on Antarctic Names (US-ACAN) after Philip M. Smith (Smith Bluffs), Deputy Director, Office of Polar Programs, National Science Foundation, who in the period 1956–71 participated in many expeditions to Antarctica in field and supervisory capacities.

== Glaciology ==
In 2001, Dr. Andrew Shepherd, a research fellow at the Center for Polar Observation and Modeling at University College London, said that Smith Glacier was losing mass quickly and contributing to the slow rise of the oceans. In 2011, Hamish Pritchard, a scientist with the British Antarctic Survey in Cambridge, UK, said that Smith Glacier was thinning at a rate of 27 feet per year.

In 2016, a study published in the journal Nature Communication, which relied on airborne radar measurements, found that melting of the ice shelves' grounding zones between the years 2000 and 2009 removed between 984 and about 1,607 feet of solid ice beneath the Smith Glacier. The Smith Glacier lost more ice than any other glacier studied for the report. The researchers found that the Smith Glacier retreated by about 21 miles during the period from 1996 to 2011. The scientists concluded that the size of the retreat was partly a result of both the unique topography underneath the ice that allowed more ocean water to sneak in between the ice and the land below.

== Sources ==
- Alberts, Fred G., ed. (1995), Geographic Names of the Antarctic (PDF) (2 ed.), United States Board on Geographic Names This article incorporates public domain material from websites or documents of the United States Board on Geographic Names.
- Chang, Kenneth (2001-12-11), "Melting Glaciers in Antarctica Are Raising Oceans, Experts Say", The New York Times, ISSN 0362-4331, "Using a second instrument on the satellite, one that measures altitude, Dr. Andrew Shepherd, a research fellow at the Center for Polar Observation and Modeling at University College London, came to similar conclusions. A smaller, neighboring glacier, the Smith glacier, is losing mass even more quickly, he said."
- Freedman, Andrew (25 October 2016), "Undermined by warm water, Antarctic glacier lost 1,607 feet of ice in under 10 years", Mashable, "The study, which relied on airborne radar measurements, found that melting of the ice shelves' grounding zones (which is where the ice meets the ocean and becomes floating ice) removed between 984 to about 1,607 feet of solid ice beneath the Smith Glacier alone between the years 2000 and 2009."
- Hood, Marlowe (25 October 2016), "Antarctic glacier thinning more rapidly than thought: study", www.deccanchronicle.com, "The Smith Glacier, spilling into the Amundsen Sea, shed up to 70 metres (230 feet) per year between 2002 and 2009, according to the study, based on NASA data collected during aerial flyovers."
- Martin Peninsula, USGS: United States Geological Survey
- Schmidt, Charles W. (January 2011), "Out of Equilibrium? The World's Changing Ice Cover", Environmental Health Perspectives, 119 (1): A20–A28, doi:10.1289/ehp.119-a20, ISSN 0091-6765, PMC 3018516, PMID 21196152, "Yet according to Pritchard, glaciers along West Antarctica's midpoint are thinning at an accelerated pace: the Pine Island glacier is thinning by up to 18 feet per year, the neighboring Smith glacier by 27 feet per year, and the Thwaites glacier by 12 feet per year."
- Toney Mountain, USGS: United States Geological Survey
- This article incorporates public domain material from websites or documents of the United States Geological Survey.
