= Schaefer (disambiguation) =

Schaefer (along with various similar spellings) is a surname of Germanic origin.

Schaefer, Schaffer, or Shafer may also refer to:

== Places ==
Cities and towns:

- Schaffer, Kansas, an unincorporated community in Rush County
- Shafer, Minnesota, a city in Chisago County
- Shafer Township, Chisago County, Minnesota, the township adjacent to the city
- Schaffer, Michigan, an unincorporated community in Delta County
- Schafer, North Dakota, an unincorporated community in McKenzie County

Landforms

- Lake Shafer, Indiana
- Schaefer Head, mountain in Pennsylvania
- Schaefer Islands, Antarctica
- Shafer Peak, Antarctica
- Shaffer Creek, a tributary of Brush Creek in Bedford County, Pennsylvania

== Other uses ==
- Schäferhund, German Shepherd Dog
- Schaefer Beer, a brand of beer from the United States
- Shaffer (company), a wholly owned subsidiary of National Oilwell Varco
- Schaefer Music Festival, formerly an annual music festival held in New York City's Central Park
- Schaffer paragraph, a five-sentence paragraph style developed by Jane Schaffer, used to write essay
- Willi Schaefer, a German wine grower and producer based in the Mosel wine region of Germany.

== See also ==
- Schaeffer (surname)
- Schafer automation system, a system for automating radio station programming
- Schaefer-Bergmann diffraction, the resulting diffraction pattern of light interacting with sound waves in transparent crystals or glasses
- Schaffer collaterals, given off by CA3 pyramidal cells in the hippocampus
- Shafer Commission, another name for the National Commission on Marihuana and Drug Abuse formed in the 1970s to study marijuana abuse in the United States
- Schaefer's theorem, either of two unrelated mathematical theorems
