= Hummer Point =

Headland of Antarctica

Coordinates: 74°22′S 110°15′W

Hummer Point is the eastern point of the ice-covered Gurnon Peninsula, an eastern arm of Bear Peninsula, on the Walgreen Coast of Marie Byrd Land, Antarctica, extending into the Amundsen Sea.

== Discovery and naming ==
The headland was mapped by the United States Geological Survey from surveys and U.S. Navy aerial photographs from 1959 to 1966, and was named by the Advisory Committee on Antarctic Names in 1977 after Dr Michael G. Hummer.

== Important Bird Area ==
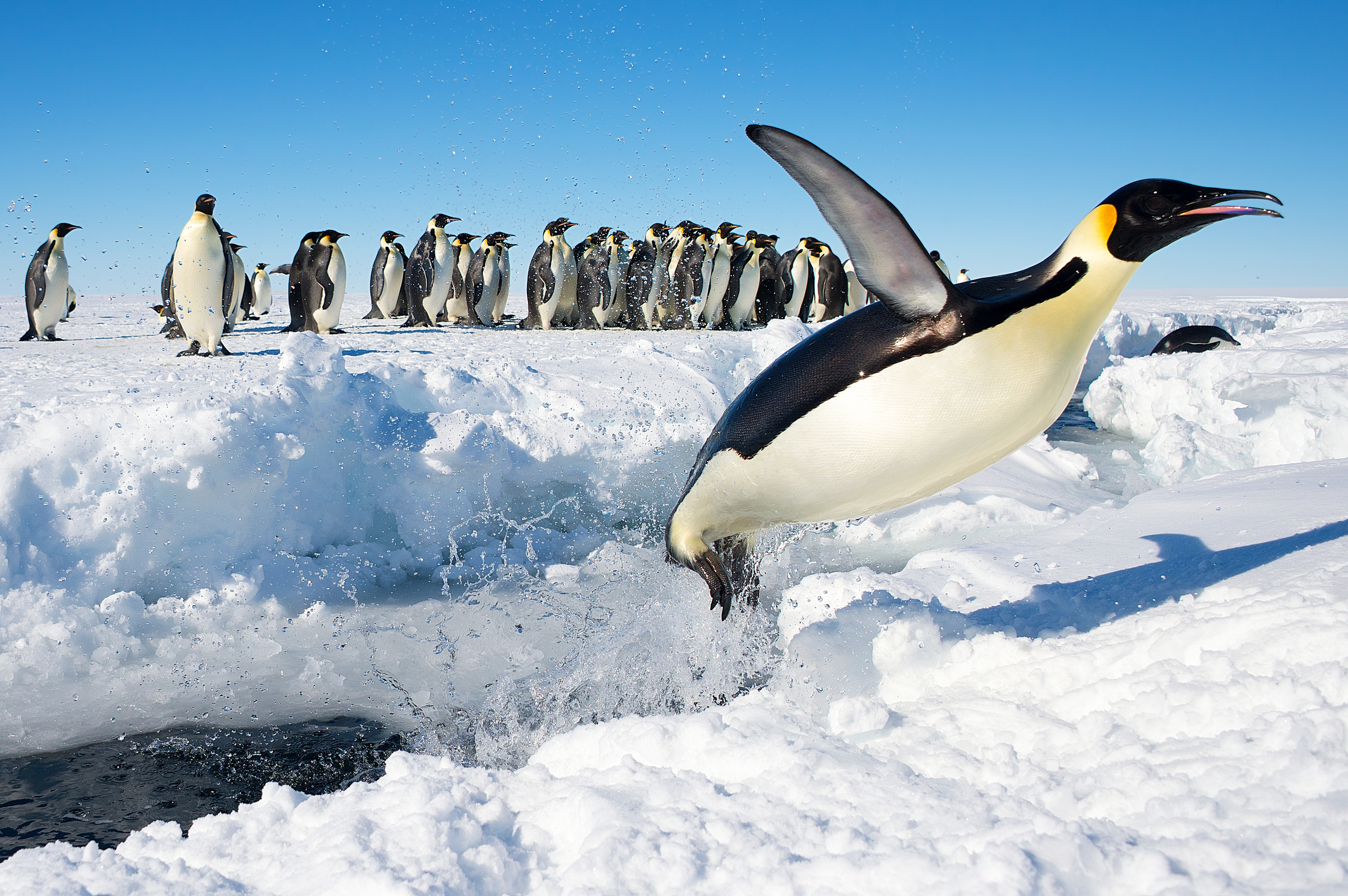
Emperor penguins breed in the IBA

A 490 ha site on fast ice east of the headland has been designated an Important Bird Area (IBA) by BirdLife International because it supports a breeding colony of about 9,500 emperor penguins, estimated from 2009 satellite imagery.
