= Lindsey Islands =

Islands of Antarctica

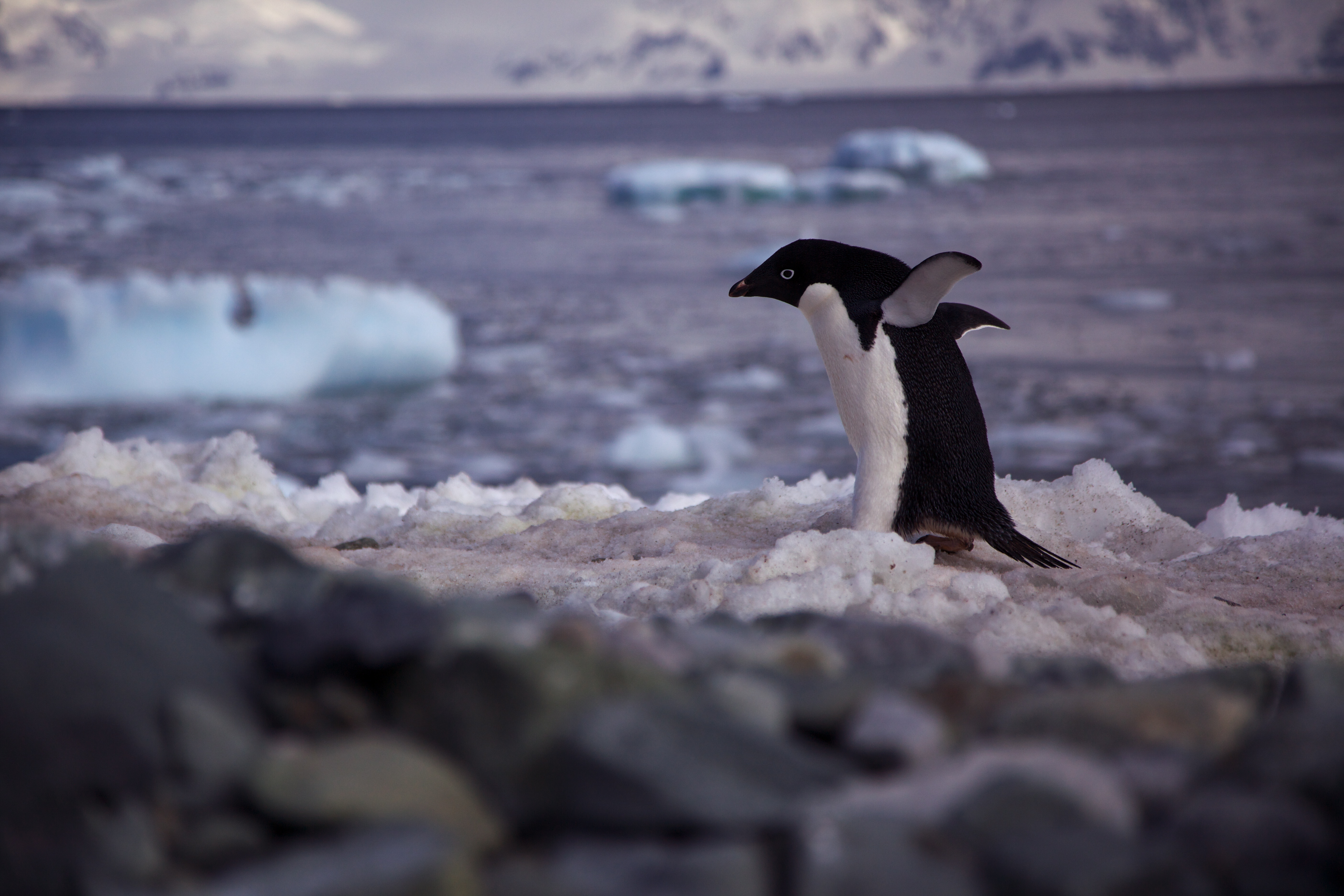
- Adélie penguins breed in the IBA

- Location within Antarctica

Geography
- Location: Marie Byrd, Antarctica
- Coordinates: 73°36′02″S 103°05′21″W
- Highest elevation: 40 m (130 ft)

Administration
- Administered under the Antarctic Treaty System

Demographics
- Population: Uninhabited

The Lindsey Islands are a group of islands lying by the north-western tip of the Canisteo Peninsula, in the eastern Amundsen Sea between Ferrero and Cranton Bays, on the Walgreen Coast of Marie Byrd Land, Antarctica.

== Description ==
The group consists of one island several kilometres across in the east, and a smaller island with several nearby outliers in the west. They form the emergent part of a shelf, less than 200 m deep, made of granitic rocks. The islands are relatively flat, the highest point being about 40 m on the largest island. They are mostly ice-free in summer, and two small freshwater ponds are present on the largest island.

== Discovery and naming ==
The islands were delineated from aerial photos taken by the US Navy's Operation Highjump in December 1946. They were named by the Advisory Committee on Antarctic Names (US-ACAN) for Alton A. Lindsey, a biologist with the Byrd Antarctic Expedition, 1933–35.

== Important Bird Area ==
An 841 ha site, comprising the Lindsey Islands group and the intervening marine area, has been designated an Important Bird Area (IBA) by BirdLife International because it supports about 53,000 breeding pairs of Adélie penguins, as estimated by 2011 satellite imagery. South polar skuas are also said to breed on the islands. Southern elephant and leopard seals have been reported from the area.

== See also ==
- List of Antarctic and Subantarctic islands
