= Kohler Range =

Mountain range in Antarctica

- Location within Antarctica

Dimensions
- Length: 64 km (40 mi)

Geography
- Continent: Antarctica
- Region: Marie Byrd Land
- Range coordinates: 75°05′S 114°15′W

Kohler Range (75°05′S 114°15′W) is a mountain range in Marie Byrd Land, Antarctica. The range is about 40 nautical miles (74 km; 46 mi) long and stands between the base of Martin Peninsula and Smith Glacier. The range consists of two ice-covered plateaus punctuated by several rock peaks and bluffs. The plateaus are oriented East-West and are separated by the Kohler Glacier, a distributary which flows north from Smith Glacier.

== Location ==
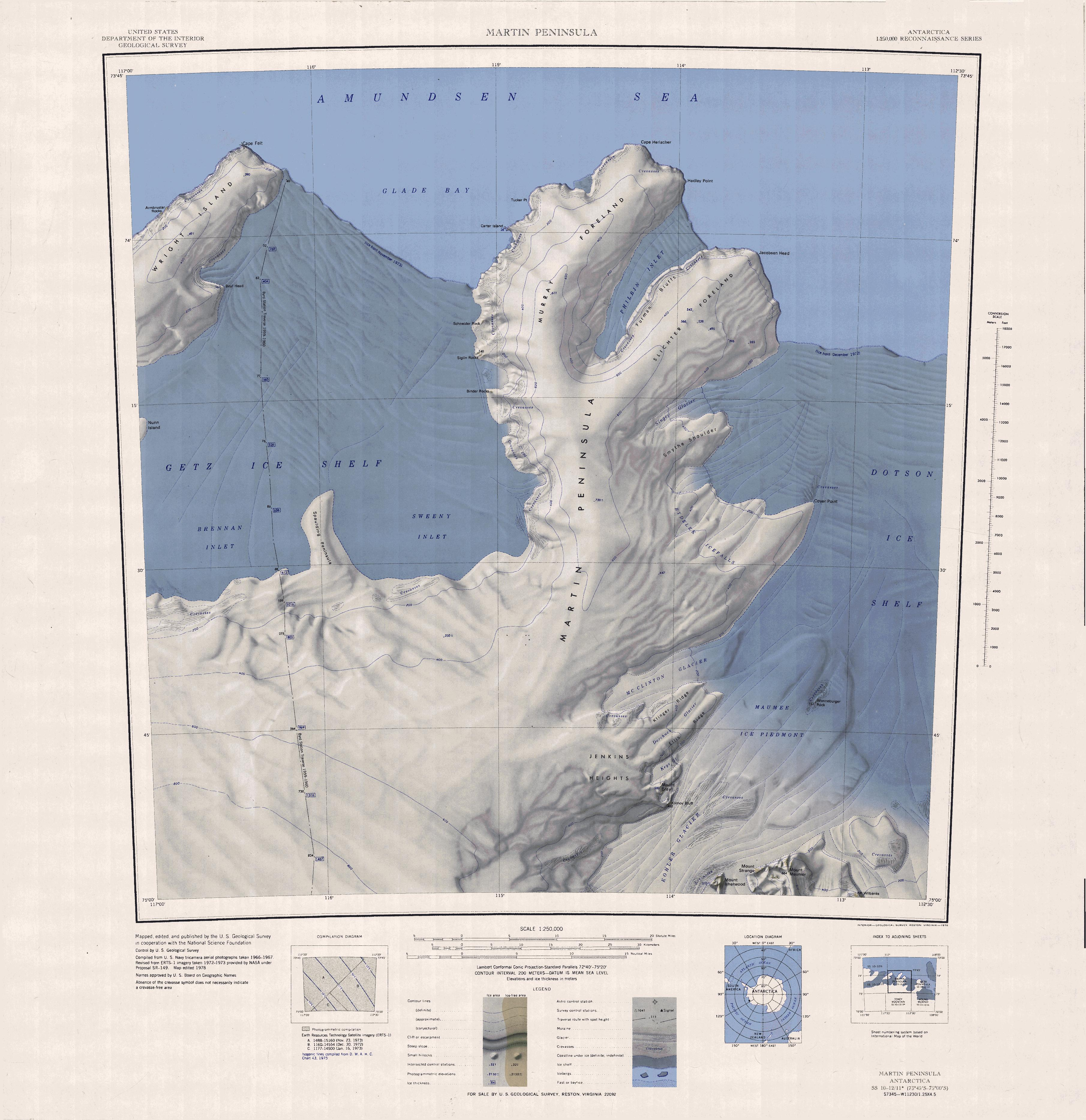
Martin Peninsula center of map

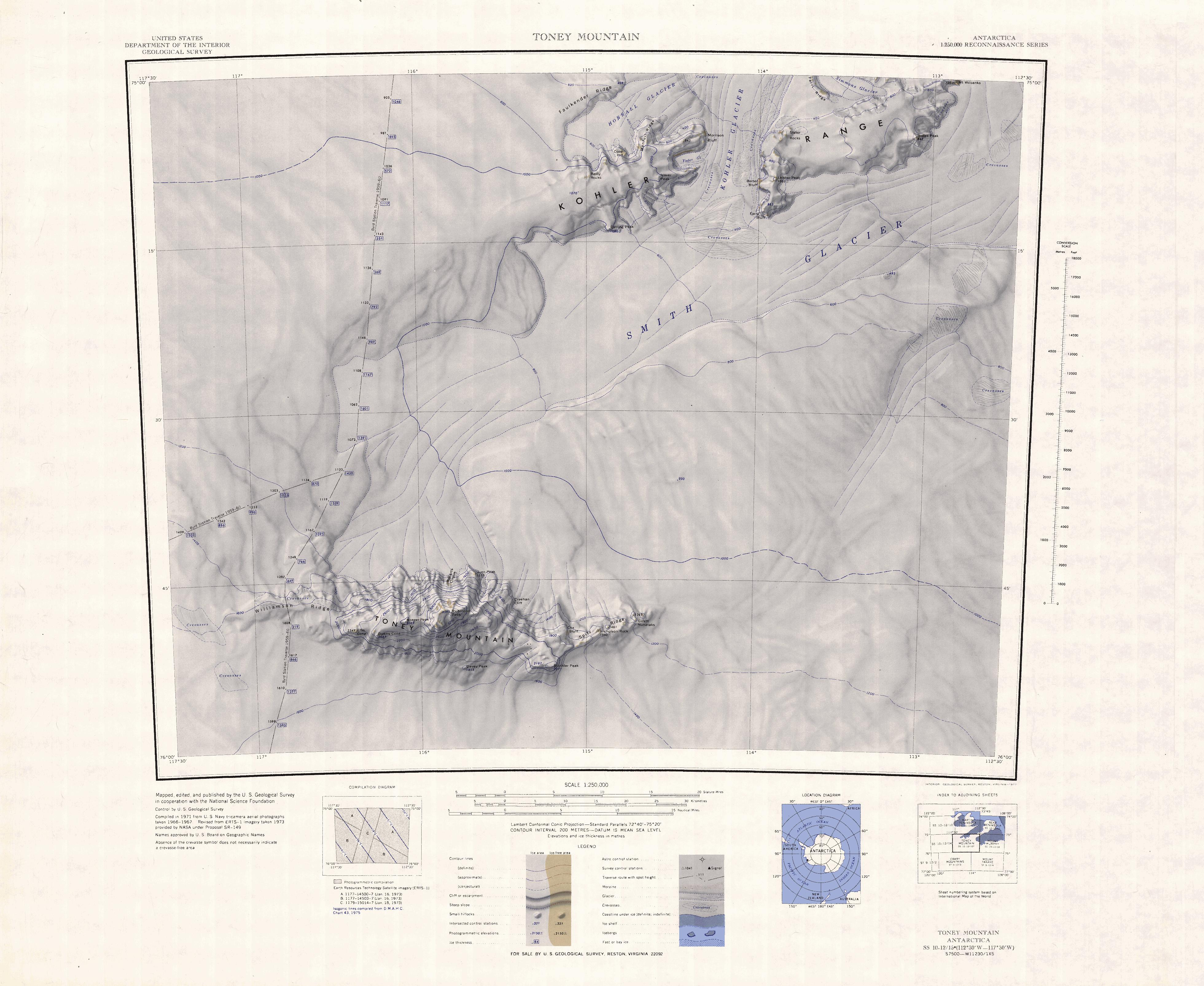
Region to the south

The Kohler Range is south of the Martin Peninsula, which separates the Getz Ice Shelf to the west from the Dotson Ice Shelf to the east. It is north of the Smith Glacier, which flows in a northeast direction from Toney Mountain to the Dotson Ice Shelf. The Kohler Glacier, a distributary of the Smith Glacier, flows north through the range, dividing it in two, and joins the Maumee Ice Piedmont. It is joined from the west by the Yoder Glacier. The Horrall Glacier, a tributary of the Kohler Glacier, runs east through the north of the range to join the Kohler Glacier. The Simmons Glacier flows northwest from the eastern part of the range to join the Kohler Glacier.

Features of the western part include Detling Peak, Haver Peak and Morrison Bluff in the southeast, and Reilly Rocks, Cope Hill and Manfull Ridge in the northwest. Features of the eastern part include Early Bluff, Barter Bluff, Leister Peak and Slater Rocks in the southwest, Ferri Ridge, Mount Isherwood, Mount Strange and Mount Meunier in the northwest, and Mount Wilbanks and Suggs Peak in the east.

== Glaciology ==
The elevation of the Kohler Glacier's bed is about 600 metres (2,000 ft) below sea level, compared to over 1,500 metres (4,900 ft) below sea level for the Smith Glacier. The nunataks in the Kohler Range became ice-free between 8,600 and 12,600 years ago. The long-term average rate of thinning would have been about 3.3 centimetres (1.3 in) per year, far lower than the recent thinning rates determined from satellite data.

== Discovery and name ==
The Kohler Range was discovered from a distance on February 24, 1940 by Rear Admiral Richard E. Byrd and other members of the United States Antarctic Program (USAS) in an airplane flight from the ship Bear. Byrd named the range after Walter J. Kohler Jr., manufacturer, and former Governor of Wisconsin, who helped furnish the seaplane from which the discovery was made.

== Glaciers ==
=== Kohler Glacier ===
74°55′S 113°45′W. A distributary of the Smith Glacier, flowing northward through the middle of the Kohler Range into Dotson Ice Shelf. Mapped by USGS from surveys and United States Navy air photos, 1959-65. Named by US-ACAN in association with Kohler Range.

=== Yoder Glacier ===
75°07′S 114°24′W. Glacier with abrupt valley walls, 3 nautical miles (5.6 km; 3.5 mi) long, which is a western tributary to Kohler Glacier. Located just southwest of Morrison Bluff in the central part of Kohler Range. Mapped by the United States Geological Survey (USGS) from ground surveys and United States Navy air photos, 1959-71. Named by the United States Advisory Committee on Antarctic Names (US-ACAN) for Robert D. Yoder, United States Department of State, Chairman of the Interagency Committee on Antarctica, 1970-73.

=== Horrall Glacier ===
75°00′S 114°28′W. A tributary glacier in the Kohler Range of Marie Byrd Land. It flows east-northeast from Faulkender Ridge to join Kohler Glacier at Klimov Bluff. Mapped by USGS from surveys and United States Navy air photos, 1959-65. Named by US-ACAN for Thomas R. Horrall, USARP glaciologist with the Marie Byrd Land Survey party, 1966-67.

=== Simmons Glacier ===
75°00′S 113°36′W. Glacier draining northward between Mount Isherwood and Mount Strange in the east part of the Kohler Range. Mapped by USGS from surveys and United States Navy air photos, 1959-66. Named by US-ACAN for Harry S. Simmons, assistant to the USARP Representative in Christchurch, New Zealand, for four seasons, 1969-70 through 1972-73. His duties took him to Antarctica in 1971 and 1973.

== Western features ==
=== Faulkender Ridge ===
75°02′S 115°00′W. An ice-covered ridge about 12 nautical miles (22 km; 14 mi) long, located west of Horrall Glacier in the northwest part of Kohler Range. Mapped by USGS from ground surveys and United States Navy air photos, 1959-65. Named by US-ACAN for DeWayne J. Faulkender, USGS topographic engineer with the Marie Byrd Land Survey party, 1966-67.

=== Detling Peak ===
75°14′S 114°52′W. A cone-shaped, ice-covered peak located 12 nautical miles (22 km; 14 mi) southwest of Morrison Bluff. Mapped by USGS from surveys and United States Navy air photos, 1959-66. Named by US-ACAN for James K. Detling, USARP biologist with the Marie Byrd Land Survey Party, 1966-67.

=== Haver Peak ===
75°09′S 114°35′W. (Note: Alberts (1995) gives the coordinates for Haver Peak as 73°09′S 114°35′W. This would put it far to the north of the range, and must be a typo. 75°09′S 114°35′W seems more plausible.) A small peak 4 nautical miles (7.4 km; 4.6 mi) south of Morrison Bluff. First photographed by United States Navy OpHjp, 1946-47. Mapped by USGS from surveys and United States Navy air photos, 1959-66. Named by US-ACAN after Lieutenant D.J. Haver, United States Navy, Assistant Officer in Charge, Supply Dept., during United States Navy OpDFrz 1965 and 1966.

=== Morrison Bluff ===
75°05′S 114°20′W. A high rock and ice bluff on the west side of Kohler Glacier, standing 5 nautical miles (9.3 km; 5.8 mi) east of Manfull Ridge in the west massif of the Kohler Range. Mapped by USGS from surveys and United States Navy air photos, 1959-66. Named by US-ACAN after Charles E. Morrison, USGS topographic engineer, who conducted surveys on several USGS Antarctic expeditions, including establishment of the Byrd ice-strain network, 1964–65, and surveys in Marie Byrd Land, 1966–67; in Ellsworth Land, 1968-69; in McMurdo Dry Valleys, 1971-72.

=== Reilly Rocks ===
75°09′S 114°59′W. A cluster of rocks located 5 nautical miles (9.3 km; 5.8 mi) north-northwest of Detling Peak in the northwest part of Kohler Range. The name was applied by US-ACAN in memory of Gerald E. Reilly, Jr., USCG. A machinery technician assigned to USCGC Glacier, he lost his life in an accident aboard the ship while it was in the Ross Sea enroute from McMurdo Station to the Antarctic Peninsula, January 22, 1976.

=== Cope Hill ===
75°07′S 114°47′W. A hill 1 nautical mile (1.9 km; 1.2 mi) west of Manfull Ridge on the north side of the Kohler Range. Mapped by USGS from surveys and United States Navy air photos, 1959-66. Named by US-ACAN for Lieutenant Winston Cope, MC, United States Navy Reserve, Medical Officer at the South Pole Station, 1974.

=== Manfull Ridge ===
75°05′S 114°39′W. A broad snow-covered ridge that descends gently from the north side of Kohler Range about 5 nautical miles (9.3 km; 5.8 mi) west of Morrison Bluff. Mapped by USGS from ground surveys and United States Navy air photos, 1959-71. Named by US-ACAN for Byron P. Manful, United States Dept. of State, Chairman of the Interagency Committee on Antarctica, 1967-69.

== Eastern features ==
=== Early Bluff ===
75°13′S 113°57′W. A high bluff on the south side of Kohler Range. It stands at the east side of Kohler Glacier at the point where this distributary drains northward from Smith Glacier. Mapped by USGS from surveys and United States Navy air photos, 1959-66. Named by US-ACAN after Thomas O. Early, USARP geologist with the Marie Byrd Land Survey Party, 1966-67.

=== Barter Bluff ===
75°10′S 114°00′W. Prominent rock bluff 1.5 nautical miles (2.8 km; 1.7 mi) west of Leister Peak. The bluff forms part of the steep wall along the east side of Kohler Glacier. Mapped by USGS from surveys and United States Navy air photos, 1959-66. Named by US-ACAN for Leland L. Barter, Ship's Engineer on the Eleanor Boiling during the ByrdAE, 1928–30, and on both the Bear of Oakland and the Jacob Ruppert during the ByrdAE, 1933-35.

=== Leister Peak ===
75°09′S 113°54′W. A peak 3 nautical miles (5.6 km; 3.5 mi) north of Early Bluff. Mapped by USGS from surveys and United States Navy air photos, 1959-66. Named by US-ACAN after Geoffrey L. Leister, biologist with the USARP Marie Byrd Land Survey Party, 1966-67.

=== Slater Rocks ===
75°05′S 113°53′W. A cluster of rock outcrops or low rock hills 4 nautical miles (7.4 km; 4.6 mi) north of Leister Peak. Mapped by USGS from ground surveys and United States Navy air photos, 1959-71. Named by US-ACAN for Robert T. Slater, EO2, United States Navy, Equipment Operator at the South Pole Station, 1974.

=== Ferri Ridge ===
75°01′S 113°41′W. A gentle ridge forming the west wall of Simmons Glacier. It terminates in Mount Isherwood at the north side of the Kohler Range, Marie Byrd Land. Mapped by USGS from ground surveys and United States Navy air photos, 1959-66. Named by US-ACAN for Guy Ferri, United States Dept. of State, Chairman of the Interagency Committee on Antarctica, 1969-70.

=== Mount Isherwood ===
74°59′S 113°43′W. A flattish, mainly ice-covered mountain with steep rock slopes, located 4 nautical miles (7.4 km; 4.6 mi) west-southwest of Mount Strange. The mountain was first photographed from aircraft of United States Navy OpHjp in January 1947. Named by US-ACAN for William F. Isherwood, geophysicist on the USARP South Pole-Queen Maud Land Traverse II, 1965–66, and on the Marie Byrd Land Survey 1966-67.

=== Mount Strange ===
74°58′S 113°30′W. A partly ice-free mountain 4 nautical miles (7.4 km; 4.6 mi) east-northeast of Mount Isherwood, standing at the east side of Simmons Glacier. Mapped by USGS from surveys and United States Navy air photos, 1959-66. Named by US-ACAN for Joe F. Strange, USGS topographic engineer, member of the Marie Byrd Land Survey Party, 1966-67.

=== Mount Meunier ===
74°58′S 113°19′W. A mountain rising to 665 metres (2,182 ft) high near the northeast end of Kohler Range, 3 nautical miles (5.6 km; 3.5 mi) east of Mount Strange. The north slopes of the feature are partly ice free and overlook Dotson Ice Shelf on the Walgreen Coast. Mapped by USGS from surveys and United States Navy aerial photographs, 1959-67. Named by US-ACAN in 1977 after Tony Kenneth Meunier, cartographer and physical scientist with USGS from 1972; member of USGS satellite surveying team at South Pole Station, winter party, 1974; member of Antarctic Search for Meteorites (ANSMET) team in the Allan Hills area, 1982–83, initiating a plan for positioning, by satellite surveying methods, the location of meteorites discovered in field operations; from 1991, in Polar Programs Section, Office of International Activities, USGS.

=== Mount Wilbanks ===
75°00′S 112°53′W. A mound-shaped mountain that is partly ice covered but has a prominent bare rock east face, forming the east extremity of the Kohler Range. First roughly mapped by USGS from air photos obtained by United States Navy OpHjp in January 1947. Named by US-ACAN for John R. Wilbanks, geologist with the USARP Marie Byrd Land Survey party, 1966-67.

=== Suggs Peak ===
75°05′S 113°06′W. A small ice-covered peak 6 nautical miles (11 km; 6.9 mi) south-southwest of Mount Wilbanks. Mapped by USGS from surveys and United States Navy air photos 1959-66. Named by US-ACAN for James D. Suggs USARP geologist with the Marie Byrd Land Survey Party, 1966-67.

== Sources ==
- Alberts, Fred G., ed. (1995), Geographic Names of the Antarctic (PDF) (2 ed.), United States Board on Geographic Names This article incorporates public domain material from websites or documents of the United States Board on Geographic Names.
- Lindow, Julia; Castex, Marion; Wittmann, Hella; Johnson, Joanne S.; Lisker, Frank; Gohl, Karsten; Spiegel, Cornelia (2014), "Glacial retreat in the Amundsen Sea sector, West Antarctica – first cosmogenic evidence from central Pine Island Bay and the Kohler Range", Quaternary Science Reviews, 98: 166–173, doi:10.1016/j.quascirev.2014.05.010, ISSN 0277-3791
- Martin Peninsula, USGS: United States Geological Survey
- Toney Mountain, USGS: United States Geological Survey
- This article incorporates public domain material from websites or documents of the United States Geological Survey.
