= Alton A. Lindsey =

Alton A. Lindsey (May 7, 1907 – December 19, 1999) was a pioneering ecologist who was largely responsible for the creation of nature preserves in the state of Indiana, where he was a professor of forest ecology at Purdue University from 1947 to 1973. His book, "Natural Areas of Indiana and Their Preservation" (published 1970), was used to support the creation of Indiana's first nature preserve, Pine Hills Nature Preserve, and he was also instrumental in the creation of the Indiana Dunes National Lakeshore. The Army Corps of Engineers plan to dam Big Walnut Creek in Indiana was also halted due to the efforts of Lindsey and a number of other activists; today there is also a large nature preserve along the Big Walnut.

Lindsey was on Admiral Byrd’s second Antarctica expedition as a biologist and brought a number of penguins back to the states with him, before he had even graduated from Cornell University. He was nationally known for his work in ecology, and published several books on ecological and other areas of natural history.

He published 10 books (not counting some small-press books of nature poetry, many of a humorous nature) in addition to scientific articles.

Lindsey was a founding member of The Nature Conservancy.

Honors: Named Eminent Ecologist of 1976, Ecological Society of America Antarctican Lindsey Islands named for him. Fellowships established in his name at Purdue University and Goshen College. Purdue University Alton Lindsey Field Laboratory dedicated to him.

== Sources ==
- Encyclopædia Britannica article - http://www.britannica.com/EBchecked/topic/341930/Alton-A-Lindsey
- Purdue University, Ross Biological Preserve Dedication - http://www.bio.purdue.edu/ecology/ross-reserve/ALindsey.html
- Alton A. Lindsey, 92, Dies; Ecologist Left Global Imprint. The New York Times.
