= Schaefer Islands =

Islands of Antarctica

- Location within Antarctica

Geography
- Location: Ellsworth Land, Antarctica
- Coordinates: 73°40′00″S 103°24′00″W
- Archipelago: Schaefer Islands

Administration
- Administered under the Antarctic Treaty System

Demographics
- Population: Uninhabited

The Schaefer Islands are a small group of islands lying close to the north-western end of the Canisteo Peninsula and 4 km (2.5 mi) south-west of the Lindsey Islands. They were mapped from aerial photos taken by the USN's Operation Highjump in December 1946. They were named by the Advisory Committee on Antarctic Names (US-ACAN) for William A. Schaefer, a geologist on the Ellsworth Land Survey, 1968–69.

== Important Bird Area ==
A 300 ha site, comprising the whole island group and the intervening marine area, has been designated an Important Bird Area (IBA) by BirdLife International, because it supports some 28,000 breeding pairs of Adélie penguins, estimated from 2011 satellite imagery.

== See also ==
- List of Antarctic and Subantarctic islands
