= Bear Peninsula =

Peninsula in Antarctica

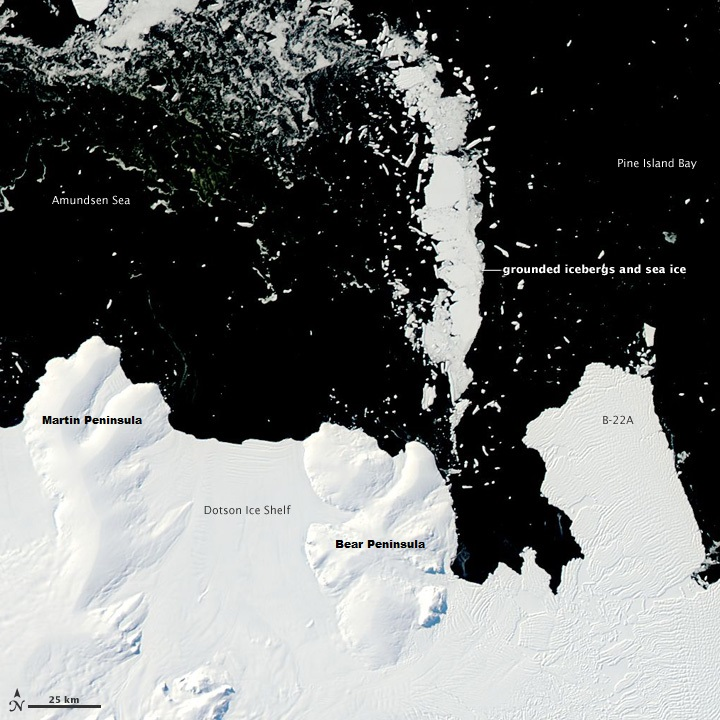
- Bear Peninsula on the Walgreen Coast, lower centre of photo. Martin Peninsula is shown to the east, with the Dotson Ice Shelf between them.

- Location within Antarctica

Geography
- Location: Amundsen Sea
- Coordinates: 74°35′S 111°00′W

Bear Peninsula (74°35′S 111°00′W) is a peninsula about 50 nautical miles (93 km; 58 mi) long and 25 nautical miles (46 km; 29 mi) wide which is ice-covered except for several isolated rock bluffs and outcrops along its margins, lying 3 nautical miles (5.6 km; 3.5 mi) east of Martin Peninsula on Walgreen Coast, Marie Byrd Land, Antarctica.

== Location ==
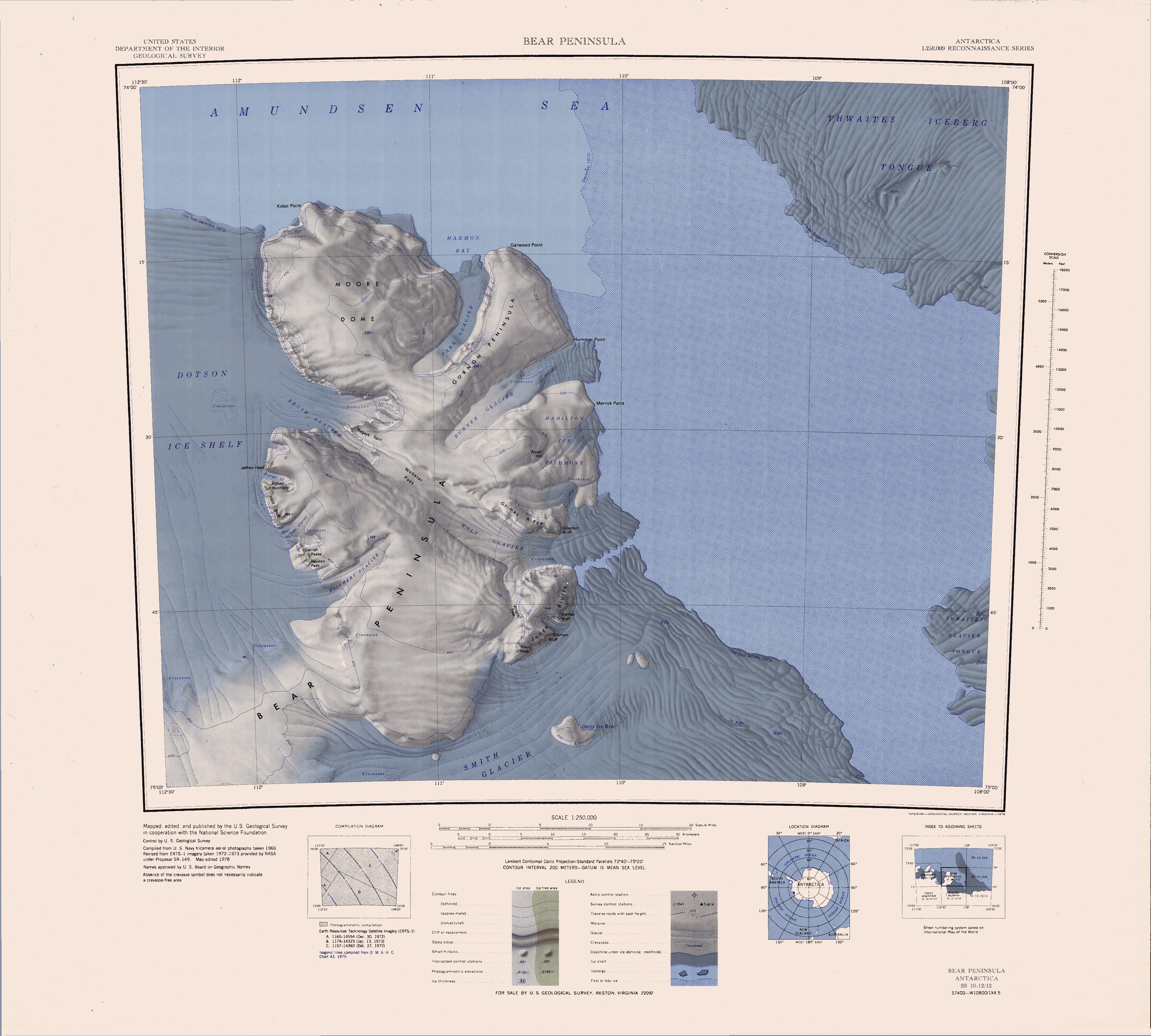
Bear Peninsula in west of map

The Bear Peninsula extends in a northeast direction from the Walgreen Coast of Marie Byrd Land between the Dotson Ice Shelf to the west and Smith Glacier and the Crosson Ice Shelf to the southeast. The north of the peninsula extends into the Amundsen Sea. The Thwaites Iceberg Tongue is to the northeast. Western features include, from south to north, Boschert Glacier, Hayden Peak, Gerrish Peaks, True Glacier, Hunt Bluff, Mount Bodziony, Zuniga Glacier, Jeffrey Head, Brush Glacier, Webster Pass, Rogers Spur and Sorenson Glacier. Northern features include, from west to east, Moore Dome, Koloc Point, Park Glacier, Harmon Bay, Gurnon Peninsula, Garwood Point and Hummer Point. Eastern features include, from north to south, Bunner Glacier, Hamilton Ice Piedmont, Merrick Point, Wyatt Hill, Grimes Ridge, Goepfert Bluff, Holt Glacier, Wright Pass, Jones Bluff, Barnes Bluff, Eckman Bluff and Mayo Peak.

== Mapping and name ==
The Bear Peninsula was first delineated from aerial photographs taken by the United States Navy Operation Highjump in January 1947. It was named by the United States Advisory Committee on Antarctic Names (US-ACAN) after the ice-ship USS Bear, flagship of the USAS, from which three reconnaissance flights were made in late February 1940, resulting in the discovery of Walgreen Coast (with probable sighting of this feature) and the Thurston Island area. This ship, under the name Bear of Oakland, also served as flagship of the Byrd AE, 1933–35, which based at the Bay of Whales, Ross Ice Shelf. Launched in 1874 at Greenock, Scotland, for use in the sealing trade, she sank in 30-foot seas and high winds in the North Atlantic, March 19, 1963, at which time she was being towed from Nova Scotia to Philadelphia.

== Glaciers ==
Glaciers that drain from the peninsula into the surrounding ice shelves or open sea include, clockwise from the southwest:

=== Boschert Glacier ===
74°43′S 111°30′W. A glacier to the southeast of Hayden Peak, flowing southwest from Bear Peninsula into Dotson Ice Shelf. Mapped by USGS from United States Navy aerial photographs taken 1966. Named in 1977 by US-ACAN after Ralph G. Boschert, USGS cartographer, a member of the United States Geological Survey (USGS) satellite surveying team at South Pole Station, winter party 1975.

=== True Glacier ===
74°38′S 111°45′W. A glacier on the west side of Bear Peninsula, flowing southwest into Dotson Ice Shelf south of Hunt Bluff. Mapped by USGS from United States Navy aerial photographs taken in 1966. Named by US-ACAN in 1977 after Lawrence E. True, United States Navy radioman who to that time had served in three deployments of OpDFrz.

=== Zuniga Glacier ===
74°34′S 111°51′W. A glacier flowing west-northwest into Dotson Ice Shelf between Jeffrey Head and Mount Bodziony on the west side of Bear Peninsula. Mapped by USGS from aerial photographs taken by United States Navy OpHjp in 1947 and United States Navy in 1966. Named by US-ACAN after Mike Zuniga, Chief Aviation Storekeeper, United States Navy, who made seven Deep Freeze deployments between 1960 and 1978.

=== Brush Glacier ===
74°29′S 111°36′W. A broad glacier in the northwest part of Bear Peninsula, flowing west into Dotson Ice Shelf to the north of Jeffrey Head. First mapped by USGS from air photos taken by United States Navy OpHjp in January 1947. Named by US-ACAN for Bernard E. Brush, station engineer at the Byrd (very low frequency) Substation, 1966.

=== Sorenson Glacier ===
74°28′S 111°22′W. A glacier between Moore Dome and Rogers Spur on Bear Peninsula, flowing west into Dotson Ice Shelf. Mapped by USGS from surveys and United States Navy aerial photographs, 1959-67. Named in 1977 by US-ACAN after Jon E. Sorenson, civil engineer, USGS, a member of the satellite surveying team at South Pole Station, winter party 1975.

=== Park Glacier ===
74°21′S 110°50′W. A glacier in the north part of Bear Peninsula, flowing to the sea along the west side of Gurnon Peninsula. First mapped by USGS from air photos obtained by United States Navy OpHjp, 1946-47. Named by US-ACAN after Chung G. Park, an ionospheric physics researcher at Byrd Station, 1966.

=== Bunner Glacier ===
74°28′S 110°40′W. A glacier in the northeast part of Bear Peninsula, flowing to the sea along the southeast side of Gurnon Peninsula. Mapped by USGS from surveys and United States Navy air photos, 1959-66. Named by US-ACAN for Sergeant Donald R. Bunner, a member of the United States Army Aviation Detachment in Antarctica during United States Navy OpDFrz 1965 and 1966.

=== Hamilton Ice Piedmont ===
74°30′S 110°18′W. An ice piedmont, 8 nautical miles (15 km; 9.2 mi) wide, to the east of Wyatt Hill, Bear Peninsula. Mapped by USGS from surveys and United States Navy aerial photographs, 1959-66. Named in 1977 by US-ACAN after Robert Hamilton, meteorologist, University of California, Davis; USARP Station Scientific Leader at South Pole Station, winter party 1975.

=== Holt Glacier ===
74°40′S 110°36′W. A broad glacier on Bear Peninsula that flows east to the sea between Grimes Ridge and Jones Bluffs. First delineated by USGS from air photos taken by United States Navy OpHjp in January 1947. Named by US-ACAN after Joseph V. Holt, a member of the United States Army Aviation Detachment in Antarctica, 1965-66.

== Western features ==
Features on the west of the peninsula, facing the Dotson Ice Shelf, include from south to north:

=== Hayden Peak ===
74°41′S 111°41′W. The southernmost of the rock summits in Gerrish Peaks. Mapped by USGS from surveys and United States Navy aerial photographs, 1959-66. Named by US-ACAN after Dennis J. Hayden, United States Navy, radioman in four deployments of Naval Support Force Antarctica (NSFA) Operation Deep Freeze(DF 75-78) to McMurdo Sound up to the 1975-78 season.

=== Gerrish Peaks ===
74°40′S 111°42′W. A line of eroded rock peaks standing 4 nautical miles (7.4 km; 4.6 mi) southeast of Hunt Bluff on the west side of Bear Peninsula. The feature was first photographed from the air by United States Navy OpHjp in January 1947. Named by US-ACAN after Samuel D. Gerrish, ionospheric physics researcher at Byrd Station, 1966.

=== Hunt Bluff ===
74°36′S 111°52′W. A steep rock and ice bluff about 3 nautical miles (5.6 km; 3.5 mi) long, standing 2 nautical miles (3.7 km; 2.3 mi) south of Jeffrey Head on the west side of Bear Peninsula. First photographed from the air by United States Navy OpHjp in January 1947. Named by US-ACAN after Lieutenant Robert B. Hunt, United States Navy Reserve, medical officer with the Byrd Station winter party, 1966.

=== Mount Bodziony ===
74°34′S 111°54′W. A bluff-type mountain with a steep west rock face, rising to over 400 metres (1,300 ft) high at the north end of Hunt Bluff. Named by US-ACAN in 1977 after Major Ronald Bodziony, United States Army, Terminal Operations Officer, United States Navy OpDFrz, 1973-76.

=== Jeffrey Head ===
74°33′S 111°54′W. A conspicuous, rock bluff, or headland, standing 4 nautical miles (7.4 km; 4.6 mi) south of Brush Glacier on the west side of Bear Peninsula. First photographed from the air by United States Navy OpHjp in January 1947. Named by US-ACAN after Stuart S. Jeffrey, researcher in ionospheric physics at Byrd Station in 1966.

=== Webster Pass ===
74°34′S 111°09′W. A snow pass in central Bear Peninsula located at the divide between Brush Glacier and Holt Glacier. Mapped by USGS from United States Navy aerial photographs taken 1966. Named by US-ACAN in 1977 after William O. Webster, United States Navy aerographer on seven OpDFrz deployments, including one winter.

=== Rogers Spur ===
74°30′S 111°24′W. A rocky, wedge-shaped spur located at the head of Brush Glacier on Bear Peninsula. First mapped by USGS from air photos taken by United States Navy OpHjp in January 1947. Named by US-ACAN after James C. Rogers, electrical engineer at the Byrd (very low frequency) Sub-station, 1966.

== Northern features ==
Features of the north of the peninsula, facing the Amundsen Sea, include from west to east:

=== Moore Dome ===
74°20′S 111°20′W. An ice dome, circular in plan and of 15 nautical miles (28 km; 17 mi) extent, rising to 700 metres (2,300 ft) high and forming the northwest portion of Bear Peninsula. Mapped by USGS from aerial photographs taken by United States Navy OpHjp in 1947 and United States Navy in 1966. Named by US-ACAN in 1977 after Captain Robert G. Moore, USCG, Commanding Officer, USCGC Burton Island, with operations in the Ross Sea, Pine Island Bay and Antarctic Peninsula areas during the 1974-75 season.

=== Koloc Point ===
74°10′S 111°39′W. An ice-covered point marking the north extremity of Bear Peninsula. First mapped by USGS from air photos obtained by United States Navy OpHjp in January 1947. Named by US-ACAN after Lieutenant Commander Bohumil Koloc, Jr., United States Navy, helicopter pilot during United States Navy OpDFrz 1966 and 1967.

=== Harmon Bay ===
74°15′S 110°52′W. An embayment at the north end of Bear Peninsula, about 7 nautical miles (13 km; 8.1 mi) wide, defined by the northeast shore of Moore Dome, the terminus of Park Glacier and the northwest end of Gurnon Peninsula. Mapped by USGS from surveys and United States Navy aerial photographs, 1959-66. Named by US-ACAN after Commander Robert H. Harmon, USCG, Executive Officer, USCGC Burton Island, United States Navy OpDFrz, 1969.

=== Gurnon Peninsula ===
74°22′S 110°35′W. A completely ice-covered peninsula about 10 nautical miles (19 km; 12 mi) long, between Park and Bunner Glaciers in the northeast part of Bear Peninsula. First mapped by USGS from air photos obtained by United States Navy OpHjp in January 1947. Named by US-ACAN after Lieutenant P.J. Gurnon, United States Navy, a Hercules aircraft commander in Antarctica during Operation Deep Freeze 1965-67.

=== Garwood Point ===
74°14′S 110°36′W. Point marking the north extremity of Gurnon Peninsula, a northeast arm of Bear Peninsula. Mapped by USGS from aerial photographs taken by United States Navy OpHjp in 1947. Named by US-ACAN after James W. Garwood, United States Navy metalsmith; crew chief at Williams Field, McMurdo Sound, and Christchurch, N.Z.; maintenance shop supervisor in eight OpDFrz deployments.

=== Hummer Point ===
74°22′S 110°15′W. The east point of ice-covered Gurnon Peninsula, an eastern arm of Bear Peninsula. Mapped by USGS from surveys and United States Navy aerial photographs, 1959-66. Named by US-ACAN in 1977 after Doctor Michael G. Hummer.

== Eastern features ==
Features of the east side of the peninsula include, from north to south:

=== Merrick Point ===
74°28′S 110°09′W. An ice-covered point on the east side of Hamilton Ice Piedmont, Bear Peninsula. Mapped by USGS from surveys and United States Navy aerial photographs, 1959-66. Named by US-ACAN in 1977 after Dale Merrick, Stanford University, upper atmosphere researcher and Station Scientific Leader at Siple Station, winter party 1975.

=== Wyatt Hill ===
74°32′S 110°27′W. A small ice-covered hill rising to.about 500 metres (1,600 ft) high at the west side of Hamilton Ice Piedmont, Bear Peninsula. Mapped by USGS from United States Navy aerial photographs taken in 1966. Named by US-ACAN after Joseph T. Wyatt, electrical engineer, Lockheed-Georgia Company, a member of the aircraft recovery team at Dome Charlie (q.v.) in 1975-76 and 1976-77, which accomplished the repair and recovery of three LC-130 Hercules aircraft damaged there during January and November 1975.

=== Grimes Ridge ===
74°38′S 110°30′W. A high, mostly ice-covered ridge at the north side of Holt Glacier on Bear Peninsula. First mapped by USGS from air photos obtained by United States Navy OpHjp in January 1947. Named by US-ACAN after Captain E.W. Grimes, a member of the United States Army Aviation Detachment that provided Antarctic support during United States Navy OpDFrz 1966.

=== Goepfert Bluff ===
74°38′S 110°19′W. A bluff at the east end of Grimes Ridge, Bear Peninsula. Mapped by USGS from United States Navy aerial photographs taken in 1966. Named by US-ACAN in 1977 after Lieutenant Eric R. Goepfert, United States Navy, officer in charge of the NSFA winter detachment at McMurdo Station, 1976.

=== Wright Pass ===
74°45′S 110°35′W. A snow pass to the west of Jones Bluffs, running north–south for 3 nautical miles (5.6 km; 3.5 mi) between the terminus of Holt Glacier and the vicinity of Mayo Peak, Bear Peninsula. Mapped by USGS from United States Navy aerial photographs taken 1966. Named by US-ACAN in 1977 after Petty Officer William L. Wright, United States Navy, who completed six OpDFrz deployments up to 1977. As Leading Petty Officer (Transportation Operations), he conducted cargo traverses across the ice of McMurdo Sound to the McMurdo Dry Valleys.

=== Jones Bluffs ===
74°46′S 110°20′W. High, mainly snow-covered bluffs rising south of Holt Glacier in the east part of Bear Peninsula. First mapped by USGS from air photos obtained by United States Navy OpHjp in January 1947. Named by US-ACAN after Lieutenant Commander S.W. Jones, United States Navy, who piloted aircraft for magnetometry studies during Operation Deep Freeze 1966 and 1967.

=== Barnes Bluff ===
74°46′S 110°19′W. A projecting portion of Jones Bluffs, 1.5 nautical miles (2.8 km; 1.7 mi) north-northeast of Eckman Bluff on the east side of Bear Peninsula. Mapped by USGS from surveys and United States Navy aerial photographs taken 1966. Named by US-ACAN in 1977 after Lieutenant Commander John O. Barnes, United States Navy, Air Operations Officer, OpDFrz, 1975-76 and 1976-77; officer in charge of the NSFA winter detachment at McMurdo Station, 1977.

=== Eckman Bluff ===
74°47′S 110°22′W. An angular bluff, mostly ice covered but with a steep southeast rock face, rising to about 350 metres (1,150 ft) high in the south part of Jones Bluffs. Mapped by USGS from surveys and United States Navy aerial photographs taken 1966. Named by US-ACAN after Commander James F. Eckman, USCG, Engineer Officer on USCGC Burton Island, 1970-71; (Executive Officer, 1975-76); Ship Operations Officer on the staff of the Commander, Naval Support Force, Antarctica, 1977-78 and 1978-79.

=== Mayo Peak ===
74°49′S 110°33′W. A flattish summit about 300 metres (980 ft) high which forms the south end of Jones Bluffs, Bear Peninsula. Named by US-ACAN in 1977 after Elbert A. Mayo, Jr., of United States Navy Squadron VXE-6, flight engineer on LC-130 aircraft, who participated in five OpDFrz deployments.

== Sources ==
- Alberts, Fred G., ed. (1995), Geographic Names of the Antarctic (PDF) (2 ed.), United States Board on Geographic Names This article incorporates public domain material from websites or documents of the United States Board on Geographic Names.
- Bear Peninsula, USGS: United States Geological Survey
- This article incorporates public domain material from websites or documents of the United States Geological Survey.
