= Cranton Bay =

Bay in the Amundsen Sea, Antarctica

- Location: Ellsworth Land, Antarctica
- Coordinates: 74°10′S 102°10′W
- Ocean/sea sources: Amundsen Sea

Cranton Bay (74°10′S 102°10′W) is a bay about 20 nautical miles (37 km; 23 mi) long and wide, lying south of the Canisteo Peninsula, Antarctica, at the eastern end of the Amundsen Sea. The southern limit of the bay is formed by the Backer Islands and an ice shelf which separates this bay from Pine Island Bay.

== Location ==
Thurston Island in north of map

Cranton Bay is on the Walgreen Coast of the Amundsen Sea to the south of the Canisteo Peninsula. It is east of the northern part of the Hudson Mountains. Islands in Cranton Bay, or west of the bay, include Clark Island, Jaynes Islands, Brownson Islands, Backer Islands, Suchland Islands, McKinzie Islands and Dyment Island.

== Mapping and name ==
Cranton Bay was mapped from air photographs taken by United States Navy Operation Highjump, 1946–47. It was named by the United States Advisory Committee on Antarctic Names (US-ACAN) for Lieutenant Elmer M. Cranton, United States Navy, medical officer and officer in charge at Byrd Station, 1967.

== Islands ==
=== Clark Island ===
74°05′S 105°17′W. An island 2 nautical miles (3.7 km; 2.3 mi) long in the eastern Amundsen Sea. It is the largest island of a small group lying 38 nautical miles (70 km; 44 mi) west-southwest of Canisteo Peninsula. Mapped by the United States Geological Survey (USGS) from surveys and United States Navy air photos, 1960–66. Named by US-ACAN for F. Jerry Clark who participated in United States Antarctic Research Program (USARP) glaciological-geophysical work at Roosevelt Island, 1961–62, and on traverses from Byrd Station, 1963–64.

=== Jaynes Islands ===
73°59′S 104°15′W. A cluster of small islands located 20 nautical miles (37 km; 23 mi) west of the southwest end of Canisteo Peninsula. Mapped by USGS from surveys and United States Navy air photos, 1960–66. Named by US-ACAN for James T. Jaynes, United States Navy, equipment operator at Byrd Station, 1966.

=== Brownson Islands ===
74°10′S 103°36′W. Group of about 20 small islands which lie just outside the entrance to Cranton Bay, about 14 nautical miles (26 km; 16 mi) southwest of the southwest tip of Canisteo Peninsula. Delineated from aerial photographs taken by United States Navy OpHjp in December 1946. Named by US-ACAN for the USS Brownson, a vessel of the eastern task group of this expedition.

=== Backer Islands ===
74°25′S 102°40′W. A chain of small islands at the south side of Cranton Bay. The islands trend northwest for 12 nautical miles (22 km; 14 mi) from the ice shelf which forms the south limit of the bay. Mapped by USGS from surveys and United States Navy air photos, 1960–66. Named by US-ACAN for Walter K. Backer, United States Navy, chief construction mechanic at Byrd Station, 1967.

=== Suchland Islands ===
74°06′S 102°32′W. A group of about eight small islands lying just inside the central part of the mouth of Cranton Bay. Mapped by USGS from surveys and United States Navy air photos, 1960–66. Named by US-ACAN for Everett B. Suchland Jr., United States Navy, radioman at Byrd Station, 1967.

=== McKinzie Islands ===
74°03′S 101°50′W. A group of small islands in the northeast extremity of Cranton Bay. Mapped by USGS from surveys and United States Navy air photos, 1960–66. Named by US-ACAN for Richard H. McKinzie, United States Navy, hospital corpsman at Byrd Station, 1967.

=== Dyment Island ===
74°08′S 102°02′W. A small island lying 5 nautical miles (9.3 km; 5.8 mi) southwest of McKinzie Islands in the inner-central part of Cranton Bay. Mapped by USGS from surveys and United States Navy air photos, 1960–66. Named by US-ACAN after Donald I. Dyment, United States Navy, cook at Byrd Station, 1967.

== Sources ==
- Alberts, Fred G., ed. (1995), Geographic Names of the Antarctic (PDF) (2 ed.), United States Board on Geographic Names This article incorporates public domain material from websites or documents of the United States Board on Geographic Names.
- Thurston Island to Jones Mountains (PDF), USGS: United States Geological Survey
- This article incorporates public domain material from websites or documents of the United States Geological Survey.
