= Maumee Ice Piedmont =

Maumee Ice Piedmont (74°44′S 113°25′W) is an ice piedmont at the terminus of Kohler Glacier, east of the Jenkins Heights, on the Walgreen Coast of Marie Byrd Land, Antarctica. It was mapped by the United States Geological Survey from U.S. Navy aerial photographs taken 1965–67, and was named by the Advisory Committee on Antarctic Names after the USNS Maumee, a supply tanker that serviced McMurdo Station from 1970 to 1985. Upon construction of fuel storage tanks at McMurdo Station, completed in 1970, the Maumee replaced smaller tankers used earlier, delivering in one voyage a year's supply of petroleum fuels.
