= Martin Peninsula =

Peninsula in Antarctica

- Location within Antarctica

Geography
- Location: Antarctica
- Coordinates: 74°20′S 114°30′W

Martin Peninsula (74°20′S 114°30′W) is a peninsula about 60 nautical miles (110 km; 69 mi) long and 20 nautical miles (37 km; 23 mi) wide that is ice-covered except for a few rock outcrops along its margins, located between Getz Ice Shelf and Dotson Ice Shelf on the coast of Marie Byrd Land, Antarctica. The farthest point of the peninsula is Jacobsen Head.

== Location ==
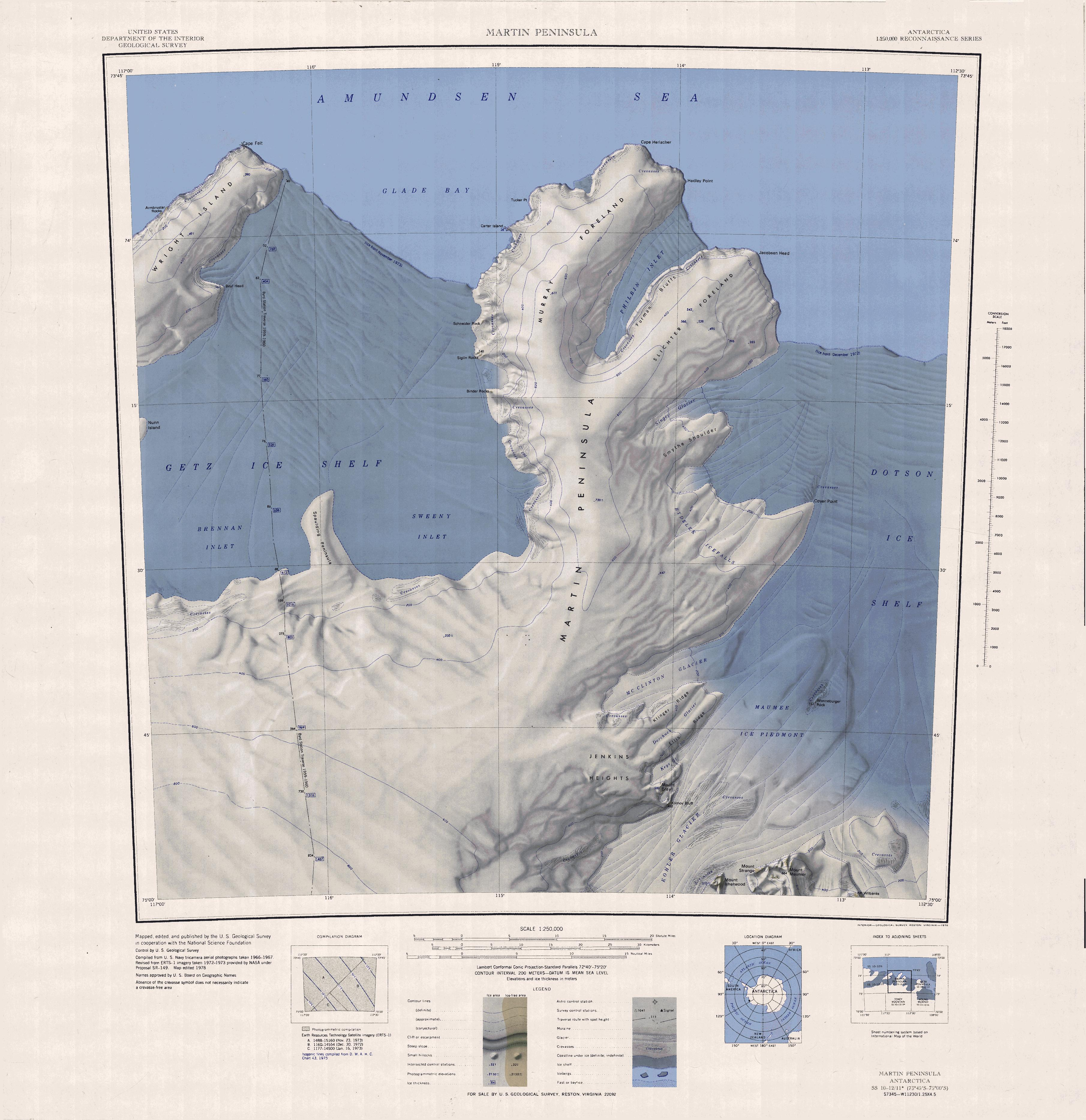
Martin Peninsula center of map

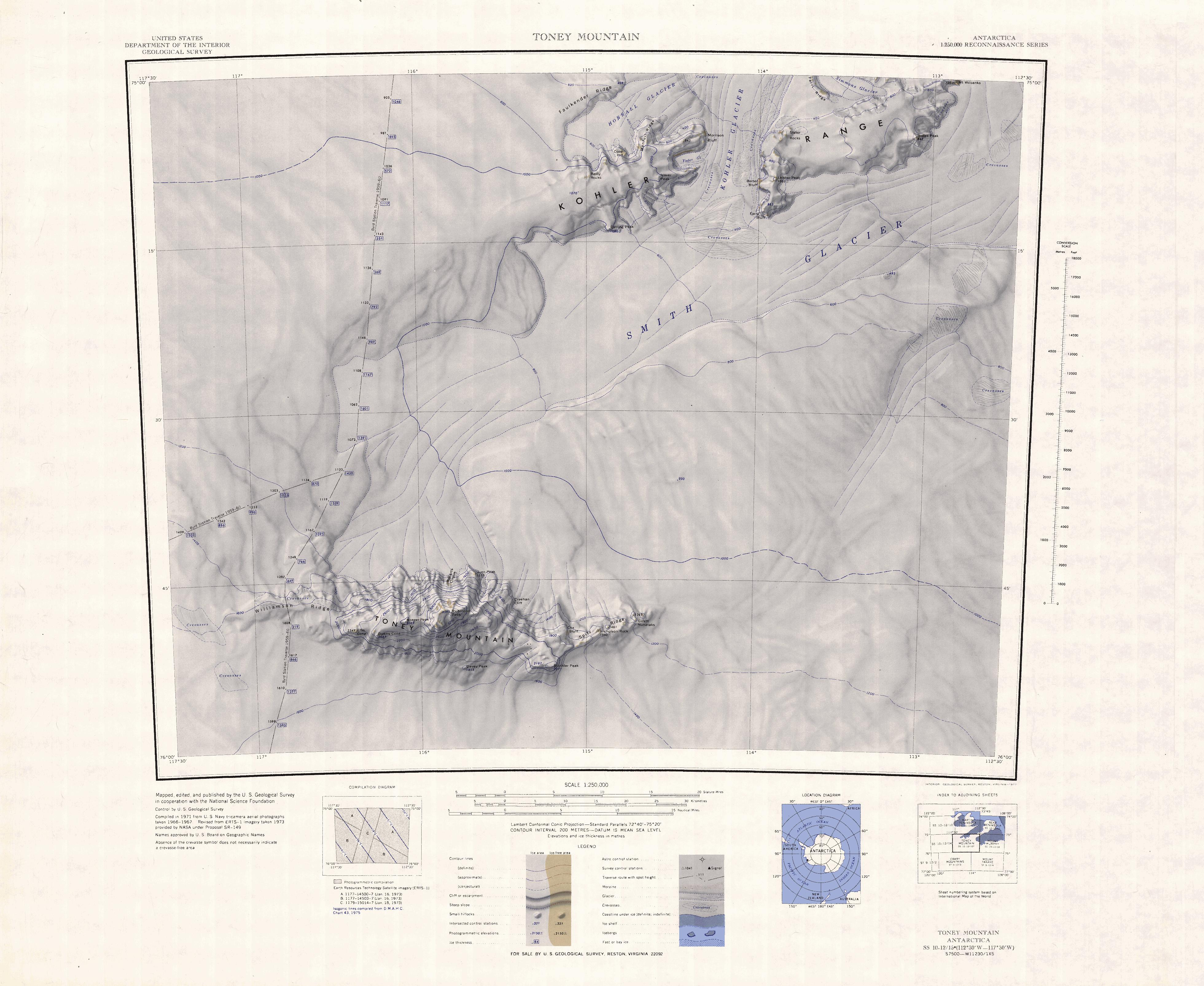
Region to the south

The Martin Peninsula extends north from the coast of Marie Byrd Land into the Amundsen Sea. It defines the boundary between the Bakutis Coast to the west of Cape Herlacher, and the Walgreen Coast to the east. Glade Bay and Sweeny Inlet are on its west side, which is the eastern limit of the Getz Ice Shelf. The Dotson Ice Shelf extends east from its eastern side. The Kohler Range is to its south.

The 1960 Sailing Directions for Antarctica described the peninsula as follows:

Martin Peninsula projects about 70 miles northward from the mainland terminating in two smaller peninsulas formed by an inlet 15 miles long. Cape Harlacher is the northern extremity of the northwestern peninsula. From Cape Herlacher to Cape Flying Fish, about 190 miles westward, the coast is indented by a very large bay and a smaller bay, the two separated by an anvil-shaped peninsula 65 miles broad in its seaward front. The very large bay is formed between the western side of the Martin Peninsula and the eastern side of the anvil-shaped peninsula.

== Exploration and name ==
The peninsula was delineated from aerial photographs taken by the United States Navy Operation Highjump in January 1947. It was named by the United States Advisory Committee on Antarctic Names (US-ACAN) after Col. Lawrence Martin, United States Army (Ret.), American geographer and authority on Antarctic exploration with the Library of Congress; member of US-SCAN, 1943–46.

== Interior features ==
Interior features include, from north to south, the Murray Foreland, Slichter Foreland, Smythe Shoulder, Rydelek Icefalls, Klinger Ridge, Ellis Ridge, Jenkins Heights and Mount Bray.

=== Murray Foreland ===
74°00′S 114°30′W. A high ice-covered peninsula, 20 nautical miles (37 km; 23 mi) long and 10 nautical miles (19 km; 12 mi) wide, forming the northwestern arm of the Martin Peninsula. First mapped from aerial photographs taken by United States Navy Operation Highjump in January 1947. Named by US-ACAN for Grover E. Murray, American geologist, member of the Board of Directors, National Science Foundation (1964-), president of Texas Tech University, Lubbock, Texas (1966-76).

=== Furman Bluffs ===
74°06′S 113°53′W. A line of steep ice bluffs that form the southeast side of Philbin Inlet on Martin Peninsula. First delineated from aerial photographs taken by United States Navy Operation Highjump in January 1947. Named by US-ACAN for Master Chief Quartermaster James L. Furman, United States Navy, staff assistant assigned to Antarctic Task Force 43 from 1964-67.

=== Slichter Foreland ===
74°07′S 113°55′W. A high ice-covered peninsula, 15 nautical miles (28 km; 17 mi) long and 10 nautical miles (19 km; 12 mi) wide, forming the northeast arm of Martin Peninsula. First mapped from aerial photographs taken by United States Navy Operation Highjump in January 1947. Named by US-ACAN after Louis B. Slichter, Professor Emeritus of Physics, University of California, Los Angeles, who has been involved with planning scientific programs for the South Pole Station, and who has trained a number of geophysicists who have gone to Antarctica to implement those programs.

=== Smythe Shoulder ===
74°18′S 113°53′W. An ice-covered promontory rising to about 450 metres (1,480 ft) high between Singer Glacier and Rydelek Icefalls. Mapped by the United States Geological Survey (USGS) from surveys and United States Navy aerial photographs, 1959-67, and United States Landsat imagery, 1972-73. Named by US-ACAN in 1977 after William Smythe, geophysicist, University of California, Los Angeles, a member of the USARP winter party at South Pole Station, 1975.

=== Klinger Ridge ===
74°43′S 114°00′W. An ice-covered ridge south of Martin Peninsula, extending northeast from Jenkins Heights between McClinton Glacier and Dorchuck Glacier. Mapped by USGS from surveys and United States Navy aerial photographs, 1959-67, and Landsat imagery, 1972-73. Named by US-ACAN after Charles Klinger, Lockheed Missiles and Space Co.; Station Scientific Leader and specialist in aurora photometry at South Pole Station, winter party 1973.

=== Ellis Ridge ===
74°45′S 113°54′W. An ice-covered ridge, 10 nautical miles (19 km; 12 mi) long and 1.5 nautical miles (2.8 km; 1.7 mi) wide, extending northeast from Jenkins Heights between Dorchuck Glacier and Keys Glacier. Mapped by USGS from surveys and United States Navy aerial photographs, 1959-67, and United States Landsat imagery, 1972-73. Named by US-ACAN for Melvin Y. Ellis, USGS cartographer, a member of the USGS satellite surveying team at South Pole Station, winter party 1974.

=== Jenkins Heights ===
74°48′S 114°20′W. A broad ice-covered area rising over 500 metres (1,600 ft) high and covering some 25 square nautical miles (86 km^{2}; 33 sq mi), located south of McClinton Glacier and west of Mount Bray. Mapped by USGS from surveys and United States Navy aerial photographs, 1959-66. Named by US-ACAN after Charles Jenkins, NOAA geophysicist; Station Scientific Leader at South Pole Station, winter party 1974.

=== Mount Bray ===
74°50′S 114°04′W. A rounded mountain that is ice-capped but has a steep, bare rock southeast face, situated east of Jenkins Heights and 1.5 nautical miles (2.8 km; 1.7 mi) northwest of Klimov Bluff. Mapped by USGS from surveys and United States Navy air photos, 1959-66. Named by US-ACAN after Thomas K. Bray, USGS topographic engineer with the Marie Byrd Land Survey party, 1966-67.

== Glaciers ==
Glaciers and icefalls draining the peninsula include Singer Glacier, McClinton Glacier, Dorchuck Glacier, Keys Glacier, and Kohler Glacier, feeding the Maumee Ice Piedmont.

=== Singer Glacier ===
74°16′S 113°57′W. A glacier flowing east-northeast from Martin Peninsula between Slichter Foreland and Smythe Shoulder into Dotson Ice Shelf. Mapped by USGS from surveys and United States Navy aerial photographs, 1959-67, and Landsat imagery, 1972-73. Named in 1977 by US-ACAN after Howard Singer, geophysicist, University of California, Los Angeles, a member of the USARP winter party at South Pole Station, 1973.

=== Rydelek Icefalls ===
74°27′S 113°54′W. An area of icefalls between Smythe Shoulder and Coyer Point on the east side of Martin Peninsula. Mapped by USGS from surveys and United States Navy aerial photographs, 1959-67, and Landsat imagery, 1972-73. Named by US-ACAN in 1977 after Paul Rydelek, geophysicist, University of California, Los Angeles, a member of the USARP winter party at South Pole Station, 1974.

=== McClinton Glacier ===
74°40′S 114°00′W. A glacier between the base of Martin Peninsula and Jenkins Heights, flowing east-northeast into Dotson Ice Shelf. Mapped by USGS from surveys and United States Navy aerial photographs, 1959-67. Named by US-ACAN after Racie A. McClinton, Jr., United States Navy, LC-130 flight engineer of Squadron VXE-6, who served in nine OpDFrz deployments through 1977.

=== Dorchuck Glacier ===
74°44′S 113°56′W. A narrow glacier, 9 nautical miles (17 km; 10 mi) long, flowing northeast from Jenkins Heights between Klinger Ridge and Ellis Ridge into Dotson Ice Shelf. Mapped by USGS from surveys and United States Navy aerial photographs, 1959-67, and Landsat imagery, 1972-73. Named by US-ACAN after Robert E. Dorchuck, United States Navy, nuclear power plant operator with the Naval Nuclear Power Unit at McMurdo Station, summer and winter seasons, OpDFrz, 1965 and 1969.

=== Keys Glacier ===
74°48′S 114°00′W. A glacier flowing northeast from Jenkins Heights between Ellis Ridge and Mount Bray. Mapped by USGS from surveys and United States Navy aerial photographs, 1959-67. Named by US-ACAN in 1977 after Keith W. Keys, AC1, United States Navy, air controller at Williams Field, McMurdo Sound, 1975-76.

== Coastal features ==
Coastal features, clockwise from the west, include Binder Rocks, Siglin Rocks, Schneider Rock, Carter Island, Tucker Point, Cape Herlacher, Hadley Point, Philbin Inlet, Furman Bluffs, Jacobsen Head, Coyer Point and Klimov Bluff.

=== Binder Rocks ===
74°14′S 115°03′W. An isolated rock outcrop located 4 nautical miles (7.4 km; 4.6 mi) south of Siglin Rocks on the west side of Martin Peninsula. First photographed from the air by United States Navy Operation Highjump in January 1947. Named by US-ACAN for Lieutenant R.A. Binder, United States Navy, maintenance coordinator at the Williams Field air strip, McMurdo Sound, during Deep Freeze 1967.

=== Siglin Rocks ===
74°11′S 115°06′W. A cluster of rock outcrops midway between Schneider Rock and Binder Rocks on the west side of Martin Peninsula. First photographed from the air by United States Navy Operation Highjump in January 1947. Named by US-ACAN after Chief Warrant Officer D.F. Siglin, United States Navy, maintenance coordinator at the Williams Field air strip, McMurdo Sound, during Deep Freeze 1967.

=== Schneider Rock ===
74°08′S 115°05′W. A rock 3 nautical miles (5.6 km; 3.5 mi) north of Siglin Rocks, protruding through the ice on the west side of Martin Peninsula. First photographed from the air by United States Navy Operation Highjump in January 1947. Named by US-ACAN after Lieutenant R.P. Schneider, United States Navy, maintenance coordinator at the Williams Field air strip, McMurdo Sound, during Deep Freeze 1966.

=== Carter Island ===
73°59′S 114°57′W. A small, ice-covered island in Glade Bay, off the west side of Martin Peninsula. Mapped by USGS from surveys and United States Navy air photos, 1959-66. Named by US-ACAN after Lieutenant G.W. Carter, United States Navy, maintenance coordinator at the Williams Field air strip on McMurdo Sound during Operation Deep Freeze 1966.

=== Tucker Point ===
73°57′S 114°49′W. An ice-covered point on the west side of Murray Foreland, Martin Peninsula, 12 nautical miles (22 km; 14 mi) southwest of Cape Herlacher. Mapped by USGS from surveys and United States Navy aerial photographs, 1959-67. Named by US-ACAN in 1977 after Robert L. Tucker, United States Navy meteorologist on nine deployments of OpDFrz through 1976.

=== Cape Herlacher ===
73°52′S 114°12′W. A bold, ice-covered cape forming the north end of Martin Peninsula. Delineated from aerial photographs taken by United States Navy Operation Highjump in January 1947. Named by US-ACAN in 1955 after Carl J. Herlacher, principal Antarctic cartographer with the United States Navy Hydrographic Office 1937.

=== Hadley Point ===
73°55′S 113°58′W. The northeast point of Murray Foreland, Martin Peninsula. The point lies 5 nautical miles (9.3 km; 5.8 mi) southeast of Cape Herlacher. Mapped by USGS from surveys and United States Navy aerial photographs, 1959-67. Named by US-ACAN after Richard C. Hadley, United States Navy, who wintered at McMurdo Station in 1959 and other years through 1977; in charge of supply functions at McMurdo during last deployment.

=== Philbin Inlet ===
74°04′S 114°11′W. Narrow, ice-filled inlet about 15 nautical miles (28 km; 17 mi) long that indents the north end of Martin Peninsula between Murray Foreland and Slichter Foreland. First mapped by USGS from air photos taken by United States Navy Operation Highjump in January 1947. Named by US-ACAN after Brig. Gen. Tony Philbin, United States Army, who served the Secretary of Defense in liaison with the United States Navy during the 1957-58 IGY.

=== Jacobsen Head ===
74°02′S 113°35′W. An ice-covered headland forming the northeast point of Slichter Foreland. First delineated by USGS from air photos taken by United States Navy Operation Highjump in January 1947. Named by US-ACAN after Commander Glen Jacobsen, United States Navy, captain of the icebreaker Atka on the 1954-55 reconnaissance cruise to Antarctica to examine sites for use as science stations during the 1957-58 IGY.

=== Coyer Point ===
74°24′S 113°13′W. An ice-covered point on the southeast side of Martin Peninsula. It is the north end of an ice-covered peninsula that extends into Dotson Ice Shelf, 23 nautical miles (43 km; 26 mi) south-southeast of Jacobsen Head. Mapped by USGS from surveys and United States Navy aerial photographs, 1959-67, and Landsat imagery, 1972-73. Named by US-ACAN in 1977 after Lieutenant Ann E. Coyer, United States Navy, first United States Navy woman to participate in Antarctic operations, OpDFrz, 1974.

=== Klimov Bluff ===
74°52′S 114°02′W. A partly ice-free east-facing bluff, located at the southeast end of Jenkins Heights, 1.5 nautical miles (2.8 km; 1.7 mi) southeast of Mount Bray. Mapped by USGS from surveys and United States Navy air photos, 1959-66. Named by US-ACAN after L.V. Klimov, Soviet exchange scientist who wintered at McMurdo Station in 1966. He accompanied the USARP Marie Byrd Land Survey party, 1966-67.

== Sources ==
- Alberts, Fred G., ed. (1995), Geographic Names of the Antarctic (PDF) (2 ed.), United States Board on Geographic Names This article incorporates public domain material from websites or documents of the United States Board on Geographic Names.
- Martin Peninsula, USGS: United States Geological Survey
- Sailing Directions for Antarctica (2 ed.), Washington: United States Hydrographic Office, 1960
- Toney Mountain, USGS: United States Geological Survey
- This article incorporates public domain material from websites or documents of the United States Geological Survey.
