= Big Walnut Creek Nature Preserve =

Nature preserve in Texas, United States

- Location: Austin, Texas, US
- Coordinates: 30°19′30″N 97°39′0″W
- Area: 47 acres (19 ha)
- Governing body: City of Austin
- Website: austinparks.org/park/big-walnut-creek-nature-preserve/

The Big Walnut Creek Nature Preserve, or simply Walnut Creek Preserve, is a 47-acre (19 ha) nature preserve located in northeast Austin, Texas, in the United States.
