= Toney Mountain =

Shield volcano in the Antarctic

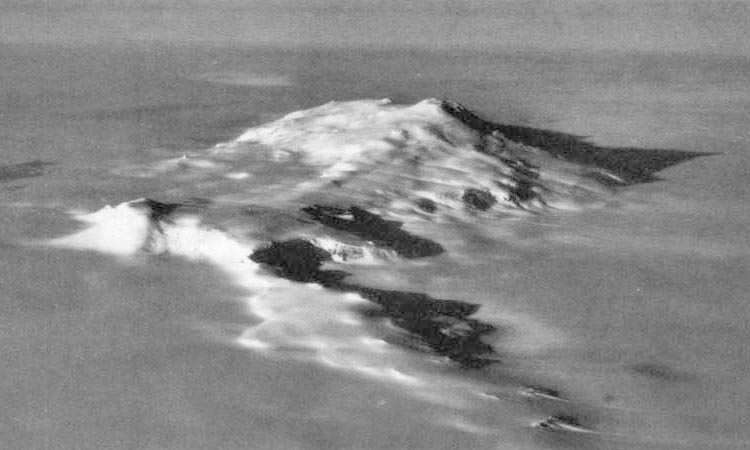
- Aerial view of Toney Mountain from the east.

Highest point
- Peak: Richmond Peak
- Elevation: 3,595 m (11,795 ft)
- Coordinates: 75°48′S 115°49′W

Geography
- Location within Antarctica
- Location: Marie Byrd Land, Antarctica

Geology
- Rock age: Quaternary
- Mountain type: Shield volcano
- Volcanic field: Marie Byrd Land Volcanic Province
- Last eruption: Unknown

Toney Mountain (75°48′S 115°49′W) is an elongated snow-covered shield volcano, 38 nautical miles (70 km; 44 mi) long and rising to 3,595 metres (11,795 ft) at Richmond Peak, located 35 nautical miles (65 km; 40 mi) southwest of Kohler Range in Marie Byrd Land, Antarctica.

== Geology ==
Toney Mountain is an elongated volcanic massif that rises 2 kilometres (1.2 mi)-2.4 kilometres (1.5 mi) above the ice and may be Antarctica's tallest volcano. The area covered by Toney Mountain is about 55 by 15 kilometres (34.2 mi × 9.3 mi) and is a basaltic lava plateau. A 3 km (1.9 mi) wide summit caldera tops the volcano, and is elongated in east–west direction; this orientation is shared with calderas on other volcanoes in Marie Byrd Land and reflects regional tectonic stress. The slopes of the volcano feature parasitic vents and glacial corries, and are much steeper north of the volcano than south of it. Most of the mountain is covered by ice and its eastern sector may be a crater. That the mountain is mostly ice covered makes it difficult to determine its composition, the origin of the elongated shape of the volcano and the volcanological relation between the parasitic cinder cones and the main volcanic pile. Its volume may be about 2,800 km^{3} (670 mi^{3}).

The plateau and parasitic cones are formed by hawaiite and the few outcrops on the main volcano by benmoreite and comendite. Latite has been reported as well. They contain phenocrysts of olivine, plagioclase, pyroxene and titanaugite in the former and of clinopyroxene, feldspar and olivine.

An age of 9.6-9.1 million years ago has been obtained on a basaltic lava flow beneath the volcano, and it has been inferred that the basal plateau formed between 10.1 and 9.1 million years ago. The massif is younger, with ages ranging from 1 million years in its lower parts to 500,000 years ago. Holocene eruptions may have also occurred at Toney Mountain as indicated by 30 kyr ash layers in ice cores from Byrd Station, although Mount Takahe and Mount Waesche are also candidates. During that time period, a number of volcanic eruptions occurred in Antarctica as recorded by ash layers in ice; this coincides with the coldest period of the Wisconsin glaciation and it is possible that the effects of ash clouds from the Antarctic eruptions caused this period of cold global temperatures. On the other hand, it is also possible that growing ice sheets during this period compressed magma chambers and thus triggered explosive eruptions. Currently, ongoing glacial retreat is causing uplift in the region.

== Geological setting ==
Toney Mountain lies in Marie Byrd Land, a tectonically and volcanically active region of Antarctica. There, a layer of basaltic rocks up to 5 km (3.1 mi) thick underlie a series of felsic volcanic edifices. These basaltic rocks in turn are emplaced above a Paleozoic basement with granite intrusions of Devonian-Cretaceous, which crops out in some mountain ranges. Beneath Toney Mountain, the basaltic floor rises from an elevation of 3 km (1.9 mi) beneath sea level, and the volcano is situated on the floor of a graben. The region is further characterized by a 500 km × 1,200 km (310 mi × 750 mi) large dome-like uplift, part of the West Antarctic Rift System, and it may reflect the presence of a stationary hotspot.

== Exploration and naming ==
Toney Mountain was probably among those viewed from a distance by Admiral Richard E. Byrd and others of the United States Antarctic Service (USAS) in plane flights from the ship Bear in February 1940. It was mapped in December 1957 by the oversnow traverse party from Byrd Station to the Sentinel Range, 1957–58, led by C.R. Bentley who proposed the name. It was named after George R. Toney, scientific leader at Byrd Station in 1957, a participant in several Antarctic and Arctic operations, serving in both field and administrative capacities.

== Features ==
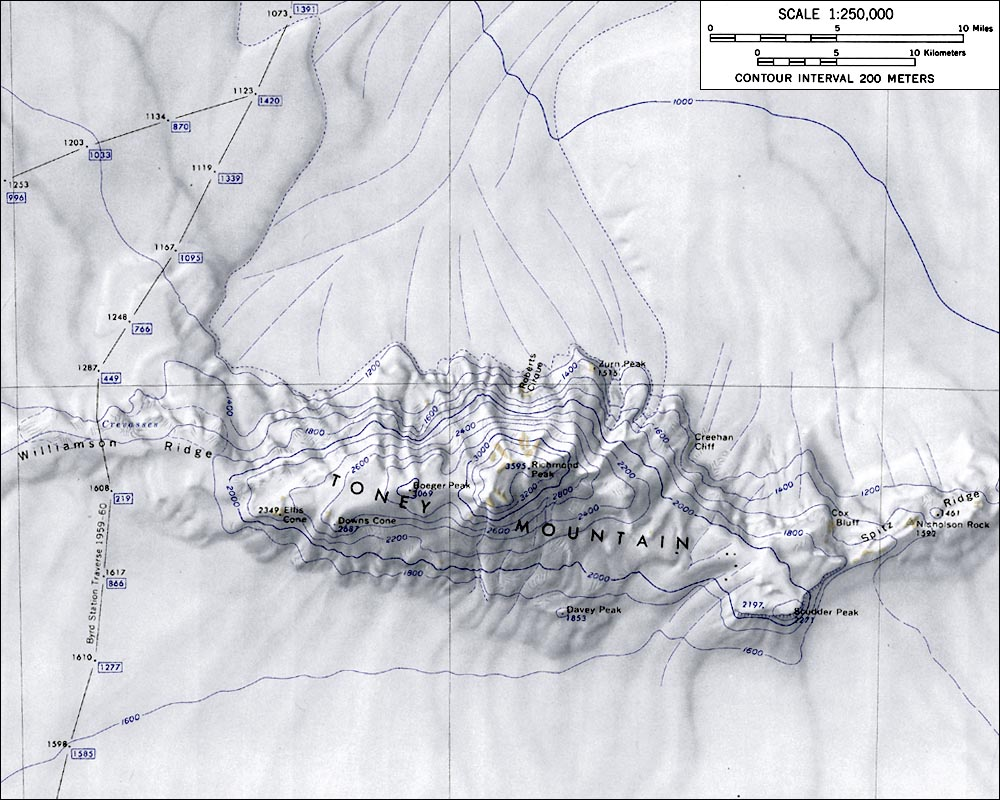
Topographic map of Toney Mountain

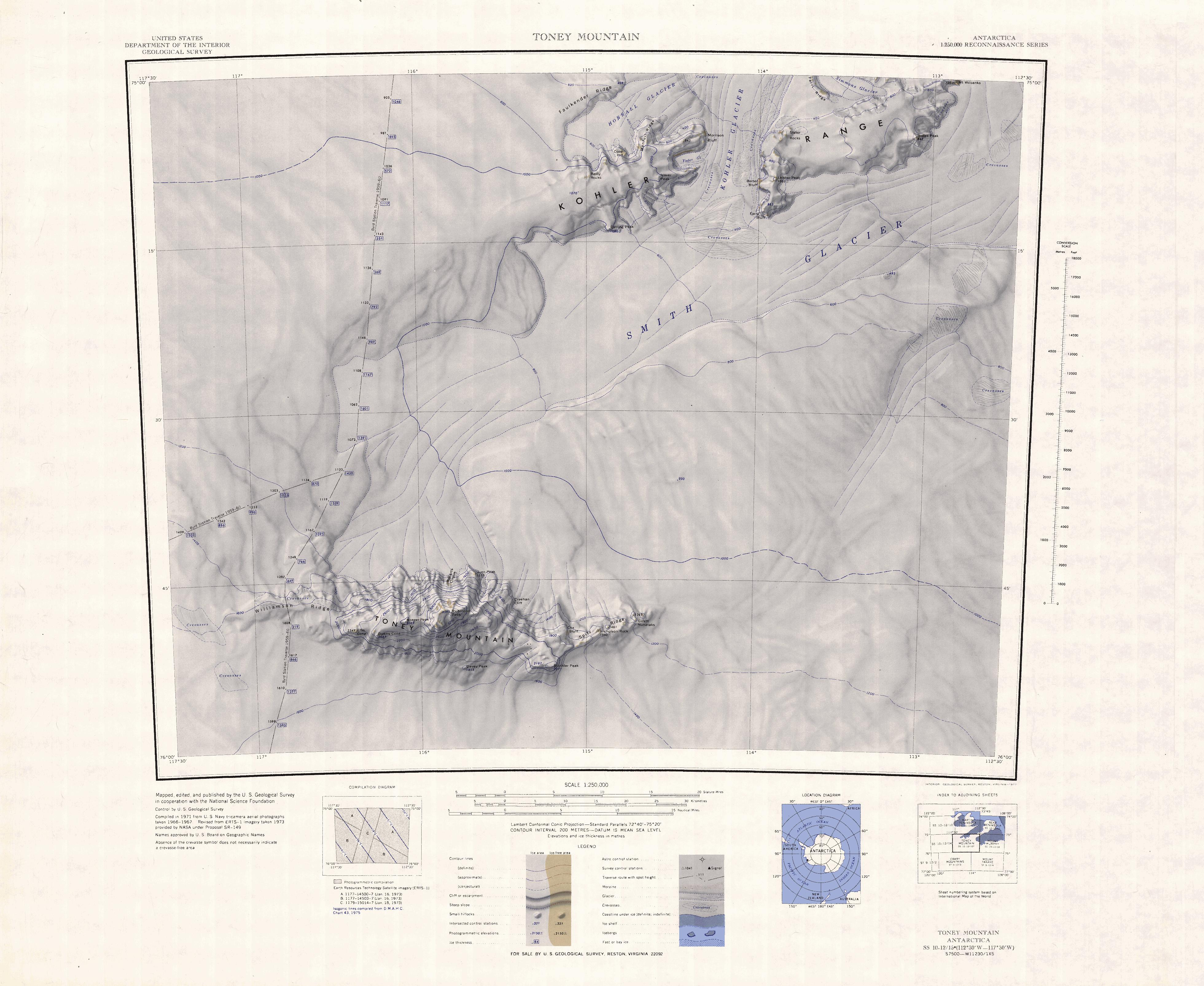
Toney Mountain region

Named features of Toney Mountain include, from west to east, Williamson Ridge, Ellis Cone, Downs Cone, Boeger Peak, Richmond Peak, Davey Peak, Roberts Cirque, Zurn Peak, Creehan Cliff, Scudder Peak, Spitz Ridge, Nicholson Rock and Gillett Nunataks.

=== Williamson Ridge ===
75°47′S 116°45′W. Low snow-covered ridge, 10 nautical miles (19 km; 12 mi) long and 2 to 5 nautical miles (3.7 to 9.3 km; 2.3 to 5.8 mi) wide, that forms a western extension of Toney Mountain in Marie Byrd Land. Mapped by the United States Geological Survey (USGS) from ground surveys and United States Navy air photos, 1959–71. Named by the United States Advisory Committee on Antarctic Names (US-ACAN) for Paul R. Williamson, ionospheric physicist at Byrd Station in two austral summers, 1967–68 and 1969–70.

=== Ellis Cone ===
75°49′S 116°23′W. One of several small cones or cone remnants along the southwest side of Toney Mountain. Mapped by USGS from surveys and United States Navy air photos, 1959–66. Named by US-ACAN for Homer L. Ellis, ACC, United States Navy, radar air traffic controller at McMurdo Station, winter party 1968, and chief in charge of the ground controlled approach unit at the Byrd Station skiway landing strip, summer season, 1969–70.

=== Downs Cone ===
75°50′S 116°16′W. One of several small cones or cone remnants along the southwest side of Toney Mountain. Located 3 nautical miles (5.6 km; 3.5 mi) west-southwest of Boeger Peak. Mapped by USGS from ground surveys and United States Navy air photos, 1959–66. Named by US-ACAN for Bill S. Downs, AC1, United States Navy, Air Controlman at Williams Field near McMurdo Station in the 1969–70 and 1970-71 austral summers. He wintered at Little America V on the Ross Ice Shelf, 1958.

=== Boeger Peak ===
75°49′S 116°06′W. Snow-covered peak 3,070 metres (10,070 ft) high situated 2 nautical miles (3.7 km; 2.3 mi) west of Richmond Peak. Mapped by USGS from surveys and United States Navy air photos, 1959–66. Named by US-ACAN for Alvin C. Boeger, Chief Aerographer's Mate, United States Navy. As a member of the United States Naval Ice Reconnaissance Unit, Boeger made numerous ice reconnaissance flights between New Zealand and Antarctica from October to December 1972 which contributed to ship operations and routing.

=== Richmond Peak ===
75°48′S 115°49′W. The central and culminating peak 3,595 metres (11,795 ft) high of the Toney Mountain massif. Mapped by USGS from ground surveys and United States Navy air photos, 1959–71. Named by US-ACAN for Addison E. Richmond Jr., of the United States Dept. of State, Chairman of the Interagency Committee on Antarctica, 1971–72.

=== Davey Peak ===
75°53′S 115°45′W. A small rock peak 1,855 metres (6,086 ft) high 8 nautical miles (15 km; 9.2 mi) west of Scudder Peak on the south side of Toney Mountain. Mapped by USGS from ground surveys and United States Navy air photos, 1959–66. Named by US-ACAN for Gary R. Davey, meteorologist at Byrd Station in 1966.

=== Roberts Cirque ===
75°45′S 115°49′W. A cirque marked by a sheer rock cliff located just west of Zum Peak along the central-north wall of Toney Mountain. Mapped by USGS from ground surveys and United States Navy air photos, 1959–71. Named by US-ACAN for John H. Roberts III, United States Navy, Chief Commissaryman with the South Pole Station winter party, 1974.

=== Zurn Peak ===
75°44′S 115°40′W. Rocky peak 1,515 metres (4,970 ft) high rising from the north edge of Toney Mountain, about 4 nautical miles (7.4 km; 4.6 mi) northeast of Richmond Peak. Mapped by USGS from surveys and United States Navy air photos, 1959–71. Named by US-ACAN for Walter A. Zurn, Station Scientific Leader at South Pole Station, 1972.

=== Creehan Cliff ===
75°47′S 115°26′W. A cliff about 6 nautical miles (11 km; 6.9 mi) east-northeast of Richmond Peak on the north side of Toney Mountain. Mapped by USGS from ground surveys and United States Navy air photos, 1959–71. Named by US-ACAN for Lieutenant Patrick E. Creehan, MC, United States Navy Reserve, Flight Surgeon of Squadron VXE-6 during Operation Deep Freeze 1971 and 1972.

=== Scudder Peak ===
75°53′S 115°12′W. Small rock peak just southwest of Spitz Ridge on the south side of Toney Mountain. Mapped by USGS from ground surveys and United States Navy air photos, 1959–66. Named by US-ACAN for Brent E. Scudder, meteorologist at Byrd Station in 1966.

=== Cox Bluff ===
75°49′S 115°07′W. A rock and ice bluff just west of Spitz Ridge on the north side of Toney Mountain. Mapped by USGS from ground surveys and United States Navy air photos, 1959–66. Named by US-ACAN for Tony L. Cox, geomagnetist-seismologist with the Byrd Station winter party, 1966.

=== Spitz Ridge ===
75°49′S 114°52′W. A prominent, mainly ice-covered ridge east of Cox Bluff, forming the east end of Toney Mountain. Mapped by USGS from ground surveys and United States Navy air photos, 1959–66. Named by US-ACAN for Armand Lawrence Spitz, ionospheric physicist, who wintered at Byrd Station in 1966 and worked additional summer seasons at Byrd and Hallett Stations.

=== Nicholson Rock ===
75°50′S 114°56′W. A rock 2.5 nautical miles (4.6 km; 2.9 mi) east of Cox Bluff on the mainly snow-covered Spitz Ridge in eastern Toney Mountain massif. Mapped by USGS from surveys and United States Navy air photos, 1959–66. Named by US-ACAN for Charles E. Nicholson, CE2, United States Navy, Construction Electrician at South Pole Station, 1974.

=== Gillett Nunataks ===
75°48′S 114°43′W. Two mainly snow-covered nunataks at the east end of Spitz Ridge and the Toney Mountain massif. Mapped by USGS from surveys and United States Navy air photos, 1959–66. Named by US-ACAN for Richard D. Gillett, RM1, United States Navy, Radioman at South Pole Station, 1974.

== See also ==
- List of ultras of Antarctica

== Sources ==
- Alberts, Fred G., ed. (1995), Geographic Names of the Antarctic (PDF) (2 ed.), United States Board on Geographic Names This article incorporates public domain material from websites or documents of the United States Board on Geographic Names.
- Toney Mountain, USGS: United States Geological Survey
- This article incorporates public domain material from websites or documents of the United States Geological Survey.
