= Schaefer's theorem =

Schaefer's theorem may refer to two unrelated theorems:

- Schaefer's dichotomy theorem, a theorem about the theory of NP-completeness by Thomas J. Schaefer
- Schaefer's fixed point theorem, a theorem about Banach spaces by Helmut Schaefer
