= Canisteo Peninsula =

Peninsula in Antarctica

- Location within Antarctica

Geography
- Location: Ellsworth Land, Antarctica
- Coordinates: 73°48′S 102°20′W

Canisteo Peninsula (73°48′S 102°20′W) is an ice-covered peninsula, about 30 nautical miles (56 km; 35 mi) long and 20 nautical miles (37 km; 23 mi) wide, which projects between Ferrero Bay and Cranton Bay into the eastern extremity of the Amundsen Sea.

== Location ==
Thurston Island in north of map

The Canisteo Peninsula extends westward into the Amundsen Sea from the Walgreen Coast of Ellsworth Land. Ferrero Bay and the Cosgrove Ice Shelf are to the north, and Cranton Bay is to the south. The Lindsey Islands, Sterrett Islands and Edwards Islands lie just west of the peninsula.

== Mapping and name ==
Canisteo Peninsula was delineated from air photographs taken by the United States Navy Operation Highjump (OpHjp) in December 1946. It was named by the United States Advisory Committee on Antarctic Names (US-ACAN) for the USS Canisteo, a tanker with the eastern task group of this expedition.

== Nearby features ==
=== Lindsey Islands ===
73°37′S 103°18′W. A group of islands lying just off the northwest tip of Canisteo Peninsula. Delineated from air photos taken by United States Navy OpHjp in December 1946. Named by US-ACAN for Alton A. Lindsey, biologist with the ByrdAE, 1933-35.

=== Schaefer Islands ===
73°40′S 103°24′W. A small group of islands lying close to the northwest end of Canisteo Peninsula and 2 nautical miles (3.7 km; 2.3 mi) southwest of Lindsey Islands. Mapped from air photos taken by United States Navy OpHjp in December 1946. Named by US-ACAN for William A. Schaefer, geologist on the Ellsworth Land Survey, 1968-69.

=== Sterrett Islands ===
73°48′S 103°23′W. A small group of islands in Amundsen Sea, lying 5 nautical miles (9.3 km; 5.8 mi) northwest of Edwards Islands and 5 nautical miles (9.3 km; 5.8 mi) west of Canisteo Peninsula. Plotted from air photos taken by United States Navy Squadron VX-6 in January, 1960. Named by US-ACAN for James M. Sterrett, biologist with the ByrdAE in 1933-35.

=== Edwards Islands ===
73°53′S 103°08′W. Group of about 20 small islands, mostly ice free, lying off the southwest tip of Canisteo Peninsula. Plotted from air photos taken by United States Navy Squadron VX-6 in January 1960. Named by US-ACAN for "Z" "T" Edwards, chief quartermaster on the USS Glacier during the United States Navy Bellingshausen Sea Expedition to this area in February 1960.

== Sources ==
- Alberts, Fred G., ed. (1995), Geographic Names of the Antarctic (PDF) (2 ed.), United States Board on Geographic Names This article incorporates public domain material from websites or documents of the United States Board on Geographic Names.
- Thurston Island to Jones Mountains (PDF), USGS: United States Geological Survey
- This article incorporates public domain material from websites or documents of the United States Geological Survey.
