= Dotson Ice Shelf =

Ice shelf in Marie Byrd Land, Antarctica

Coordinates: 74°24′S 112°22′W

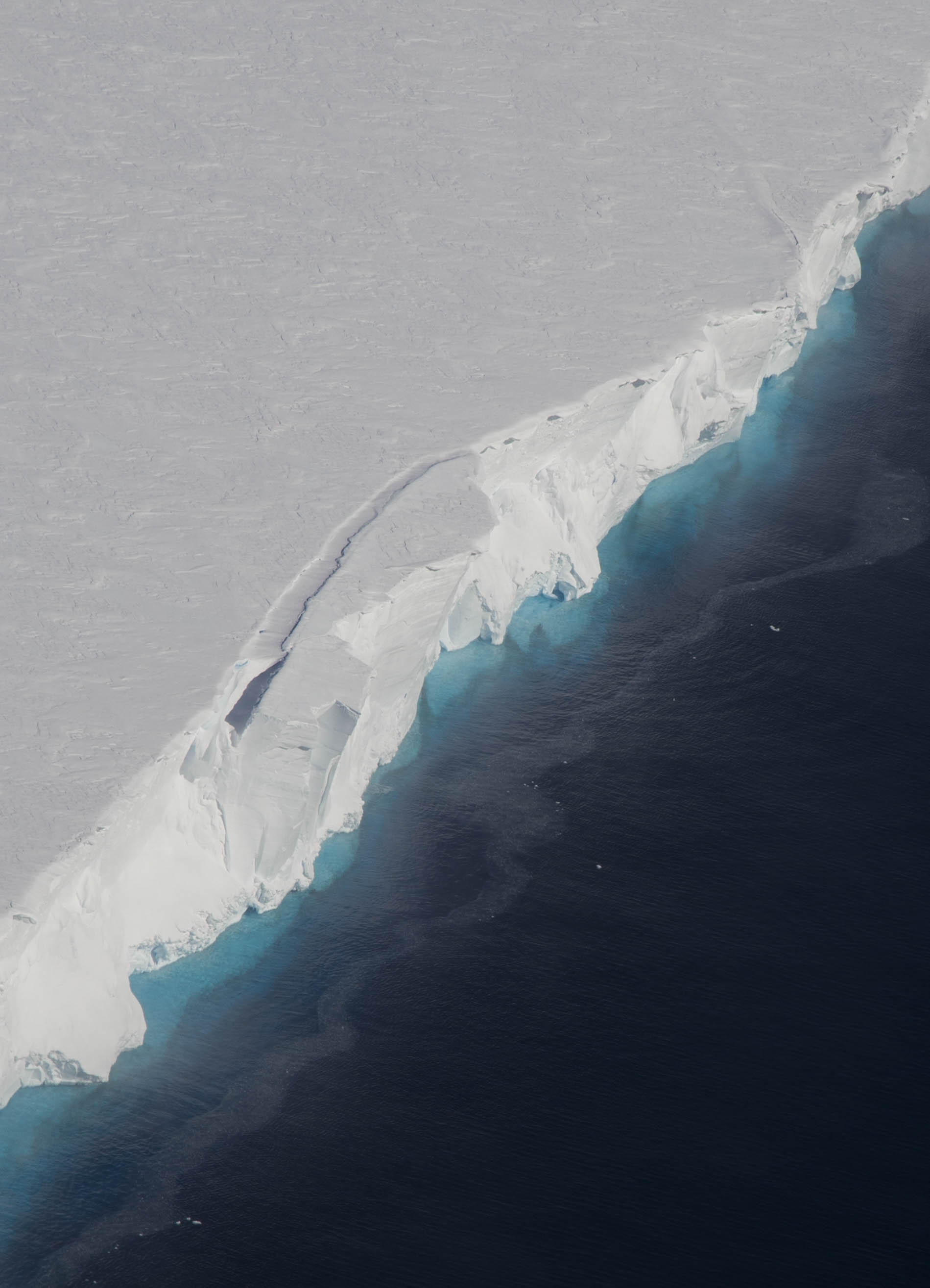
The edge of the Dotson Ice Shelf in November 2016

Location in Antarctica

Dotson Ice Shelf is an ice shelf about 30 miles (50 km) wide between Martin Peninsula and Bear Peninsula on the coast of Marie Byrd Land in Antarctica. It was first mapped by the U.S. Geological Survey from air photos obtained by U.S. Navy Operation Highjump in January 1947, and was named by the Advisory Committee on Antarctic Names for Lieutenant William A. Dotson, US Navy, formerly Officer in Charge of the Ice Reconnaissance Unit of the Naval Oceanographic Office, killed in a plane crash in Alaska in November 1964 while on an ice reconnaissance mission.

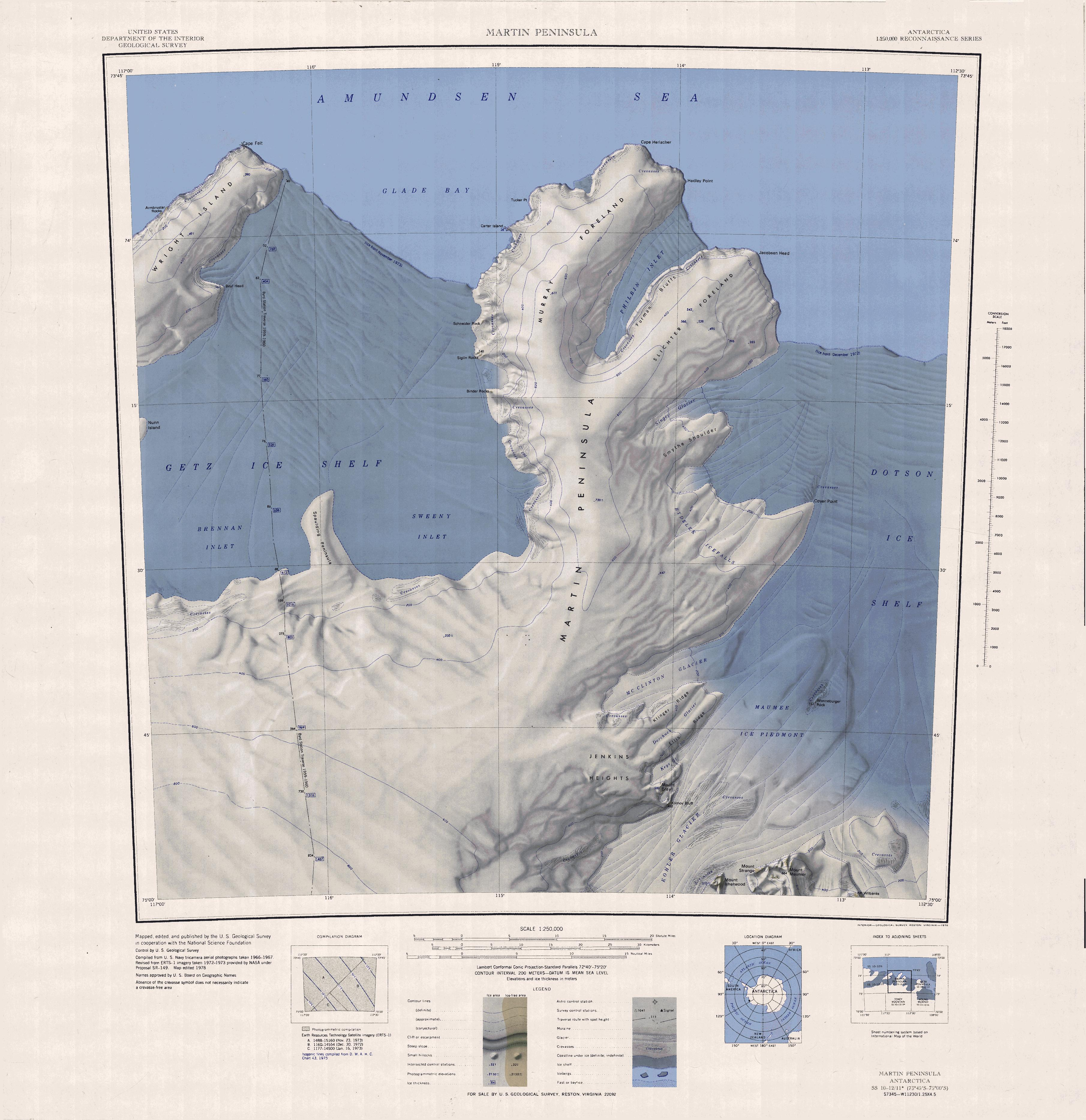
Dotson Ice Shelf in east of map

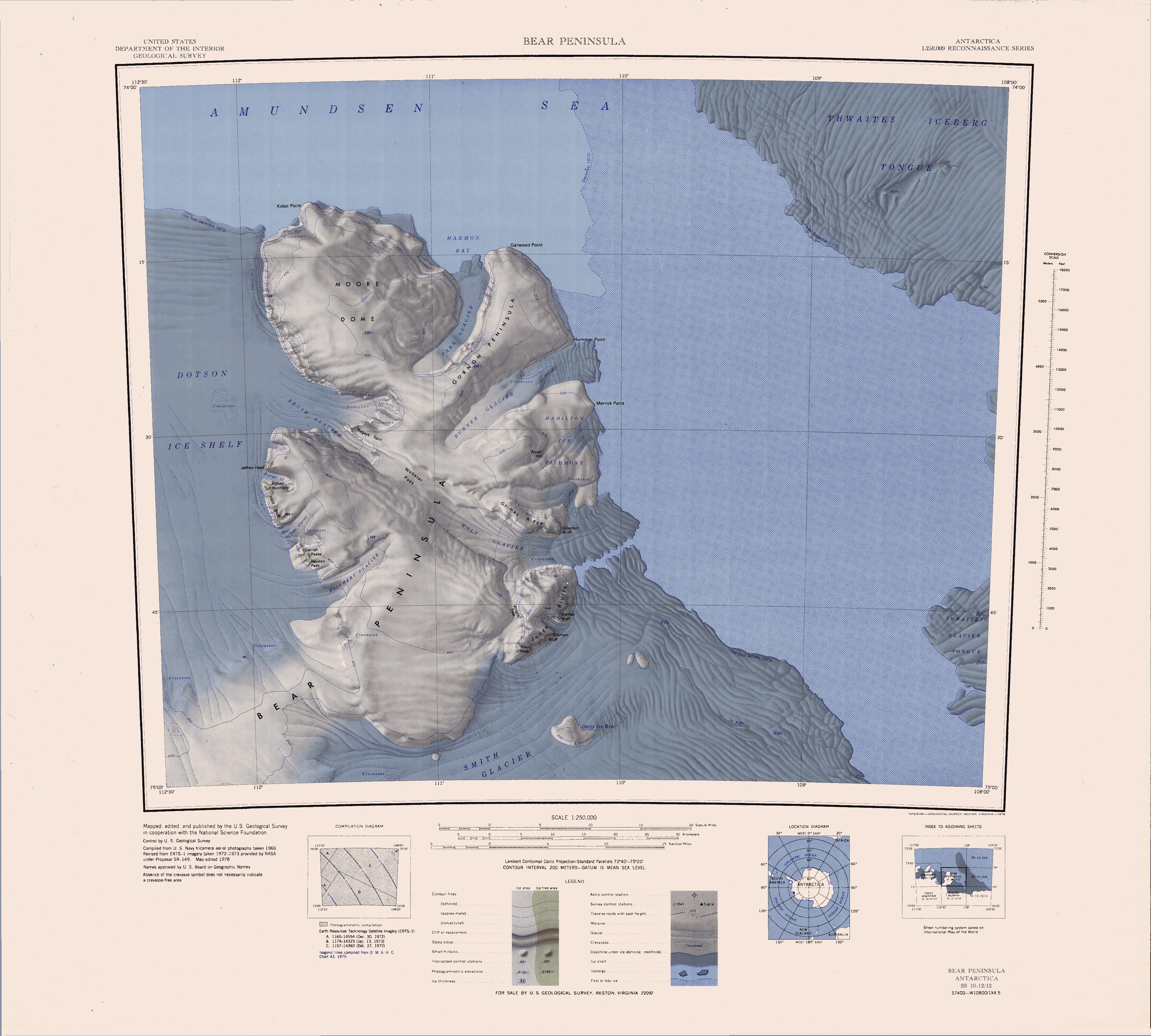
Dotson Ice Shelf in west of map
