= Walgreen Coast =

Coast in Marie Byrd Land, Antarctica

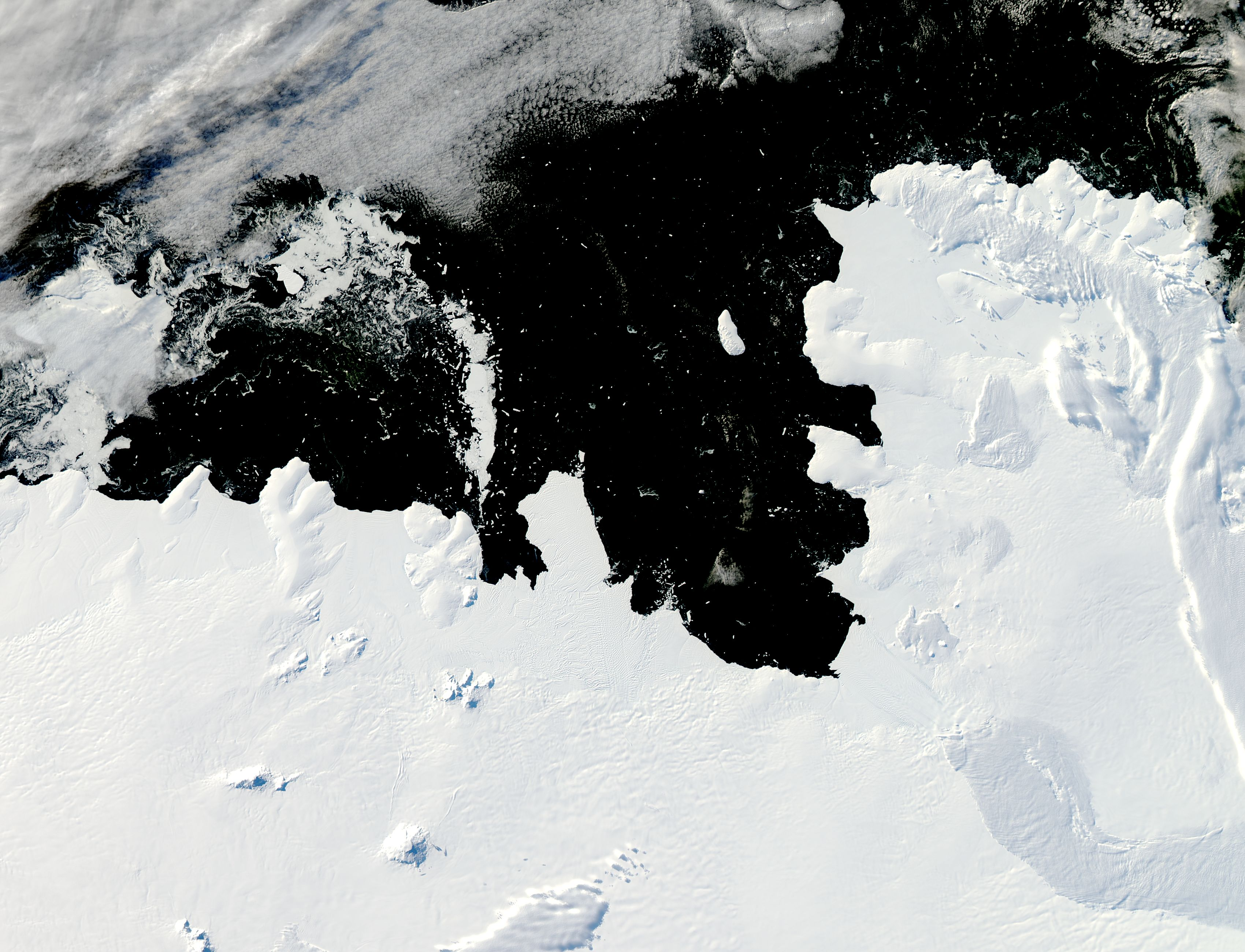
Satellite image of the Walgreen Coast.

The Walgreen Coast (75°30′S 107°0′W) is a portion of the coast of Antarctica between Cape Herlacher and Cape Waite, or between Eights Coast on the east and Bakutis Coast in the west. It is part of Marie Byrd Land. It extends from 103°24'W to 114°12'W. It was discovered by Richard E. Byrd and members of the US Antarctic Service (USAS) by flights from the USS Bear during February 1940.

The Walgreen Coast was named by Byrd after Charles R. Walgreen, president of the retail company Walgreens at the time, who was a funder of the Byrd Antarctic Expedition, 1933–1935, and assisted in equipping the Bear for the USAS, 1939–1941. This coast was mapped in detail by the United States Geological Survey from ground surveys and U.S. Navy air photographs, 1959–66.

It contains Thwaites Glacier, also known as the "Doomsday Glacier", for its major contributions to sea level rise as a result of climate change.

== See also ==
- Wright Pass
