= Siniff Bay =

Bay in Antarctica

- Location within Antarctica
- Location: Marie Byrd Land, Antarctica
- Coordinates: 74°40′S 135°50′W
- Ocean/sea sources: Pacific Ocean

Siniff Bay (74°40′S 135°50′W) is a bay 13 nautical miles (24 km; 15 mi) wide between Verleger Point and Melville Point, along the coast of Marie Byrd Land, Antarctica.

== Discovery and name ==
Siniff Bay was mapped by the United States Geological Survey (USGS) from surveys and United States Navy air photos, 1959–65. It was named by United States Advisory Committee on Antarctic Names (US-ACAN) for Donald B. Siniff, leader of a United States Antarctic Research Program (USARP) party that studied population dynamics and behavior of Weddell seals in the McMurdo Sound area, 1971–72. He also worked in the McMurdo Station area the three preceding austral summers and participated in the International Weddell Sea Oceanographic Expedition, 1967–68.

== Location ==
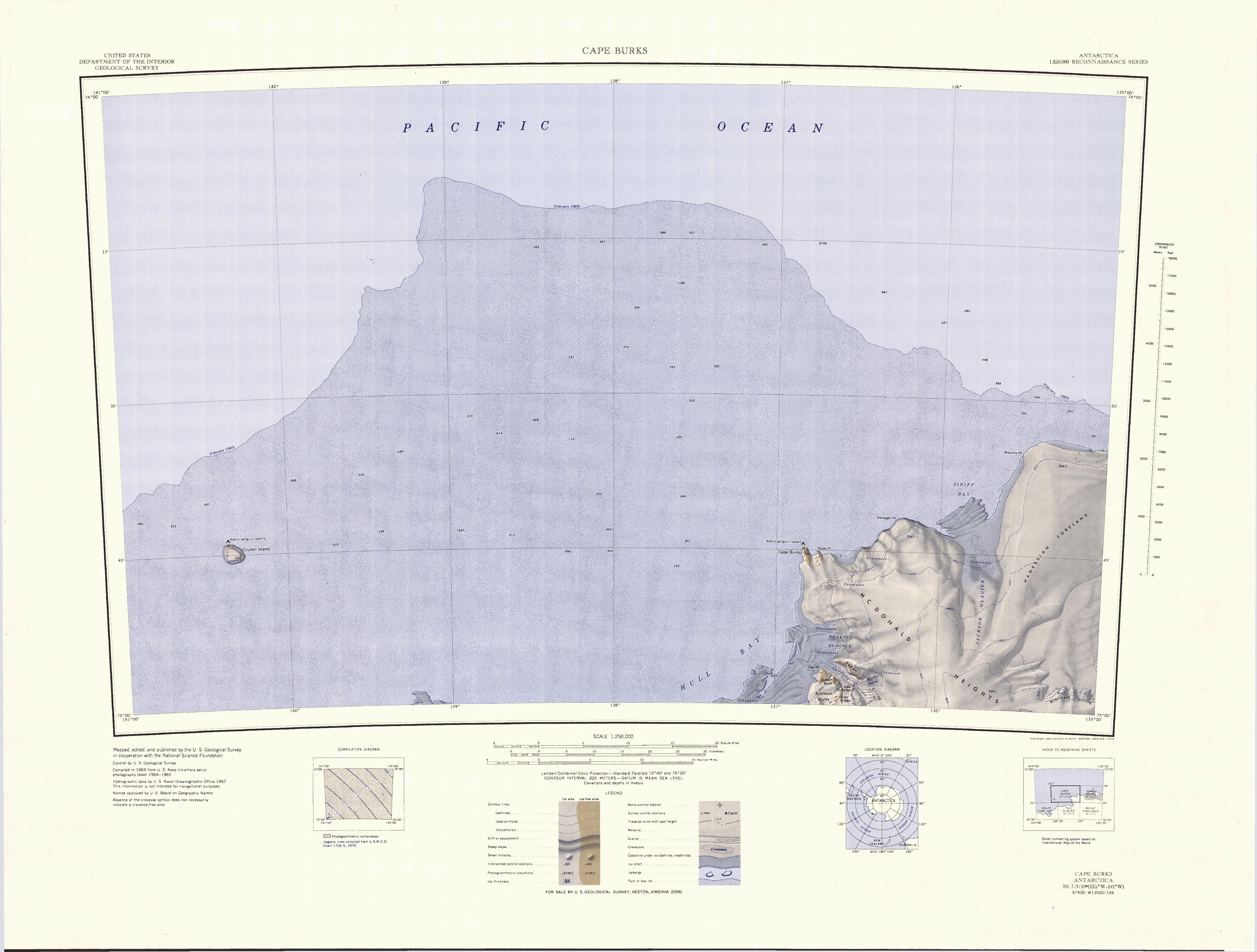
Siniff Bay north of map, east of center

Siniff Bay is on the Pacific Ocean coast of Marie Byrd Land, between Verleger Point to the west and Melville Point to the east. It is east of Hull Bay, which extends to Cape Burks. Rose Point lies between the two bays. The Jackson Glacier drains north from the McDonald Heights into Siniff Bay. Hanessian Foreland is to the west of the glacier and extends along the east side of the bay.

== Features ==
=== Verleger Point ===
74°42′S 136°15′W. Point marking the west side of the entrance to Siniff Bay. Mapped by USGS from surveys and United States Navy air photos, 1959-65. Named by US-ACAN for Lieutenant (j.g.) W.F. Verleger, United States Navy Reserve, Master of the Jacob Ruppert on the first trip to Bay of Whales (1933) during ByrdAE, 1933-35.

=== Melville Point ===
74°35′S 135°31′W. A point marking the east side of the entrance to Siniff Bay. Mapped by USGS from surveys and United States Navy air photos, 1959-65. Named by US-ACAN for Captain Frederick C. Melville, Master of the City of New York in voyages to the Bay of Whales during the ByrdAE, 1928-30.

=== Rose Point ===
74°45′S 136°45′W. A rocky point 1 nautical mile (1.9 km; 1.2 mi) east of Cape Burks. Mapped by USGS from surveys and United States Navy air photos, 1959-65. Named by US-ACAN for Stephen D. Rose, First Officer of the Bear of Oakland on the first voyage to Bay of Whales (1933). He was master of the Jacob Ruppert on its second voyage to Bay of Whales (1935), during the ByrdAE, 1933-35.

=== Jackson Glacier ===
74°47′S 135°45′W. A glacier about 10 nautical miles (19 km; 12 mi) long, flowing north from McDonald Heights into Siniff Bay. Mapped by USGS from surveys and United States Navy air photos, 1959-65. Named by US-ACAN for Bernard V. Jackson, Station Scientific Leader at South Pole Station, 1971.

=== Hanessian Foreland ===
74°42′S 135°15′W. A relatively low, snow-covered foreland or peninsula, over 20 nautical miles (37 km; 23 mi) long and 10 nautical miles (19 km; 12 mi) wide. It extends seaward between Siniff Bay and the western end of Getz Ice Shelf. Mapped by USGS from surveys and United States Navy aerial photography, 1959-65. Named by US-ACAN after John Hanessian, Jr. (1925-74), of George Washington University, Washington DC, noted authority on political science and international affairs. At the time of his death he was on leave to the National Science Foundation. From 1954-58, he served on the National Academy of Sciences staff and made substantial contribution to the Committee on Polar Research in the planning and carrying out of the US-IGY program.

== Sources ==
- Alberts, Fred G., ed. (1995), Geographic Names of the Antarctic (PDF) (2 ed.), United States Board on Geographic Names This article incorporates public domain material from websites or documents of the United States Board on Geographic Names.
- Cape Burks, USGS: United States Geological Survey
- This article incorporates public domain material from websites or documents of the United States Geological Survey.
