= Phillips Mountains =

Mountain range in Antarctica

- Location within Antarctica

Geography
- Continent: Antarctica
- Area: Marie Byrd Land
- Range coordinates: 76°16′S 145°0′W
- Parent range: Ford Ranges

The Phillips Mountains (76°16′S 145°0′W) are a range of mountains on the north side of Balchen Glacier and Block Bay in the Ford Ranges, Marie Byrd Land, Antarctica.

== Location ==
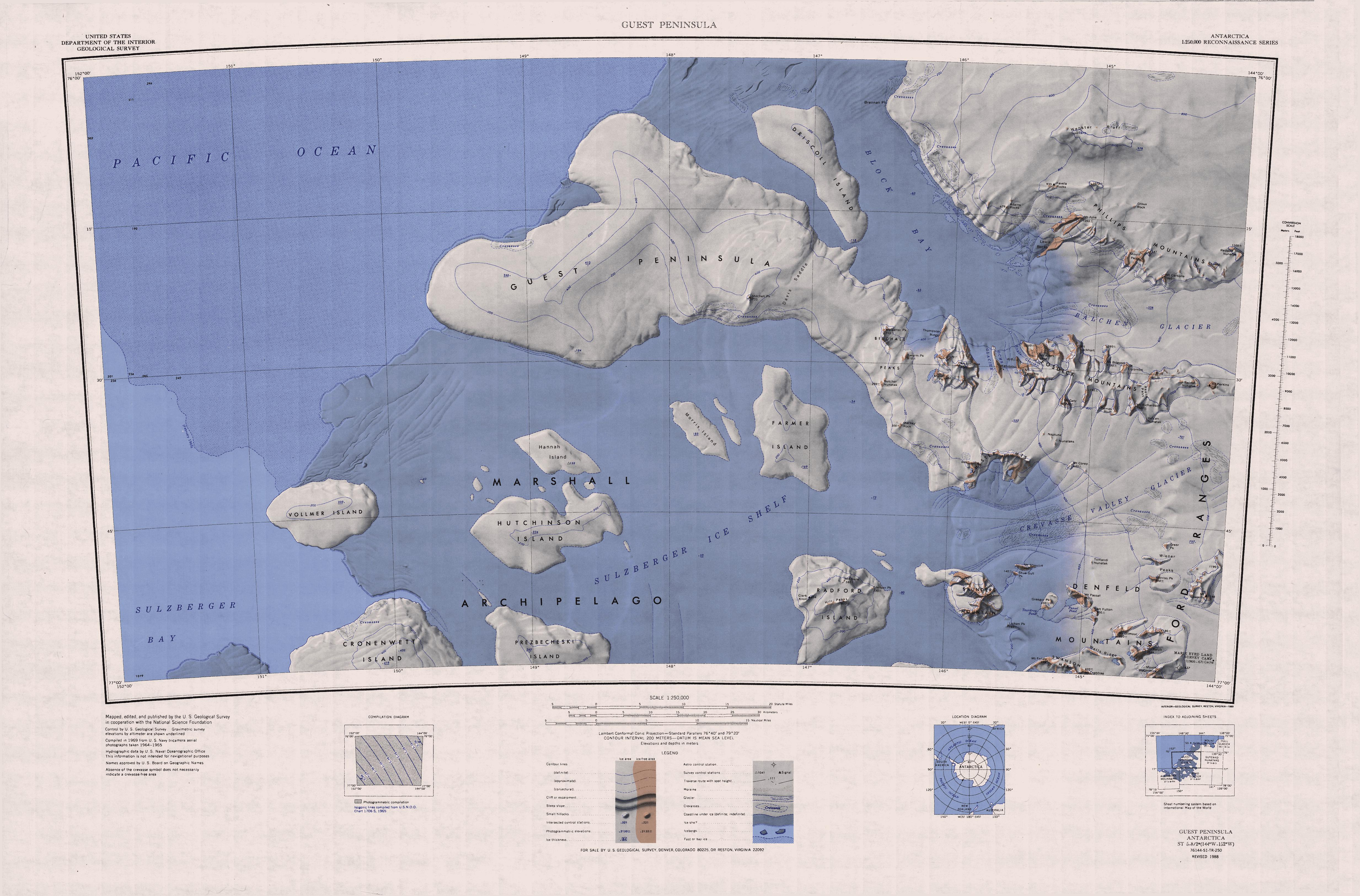
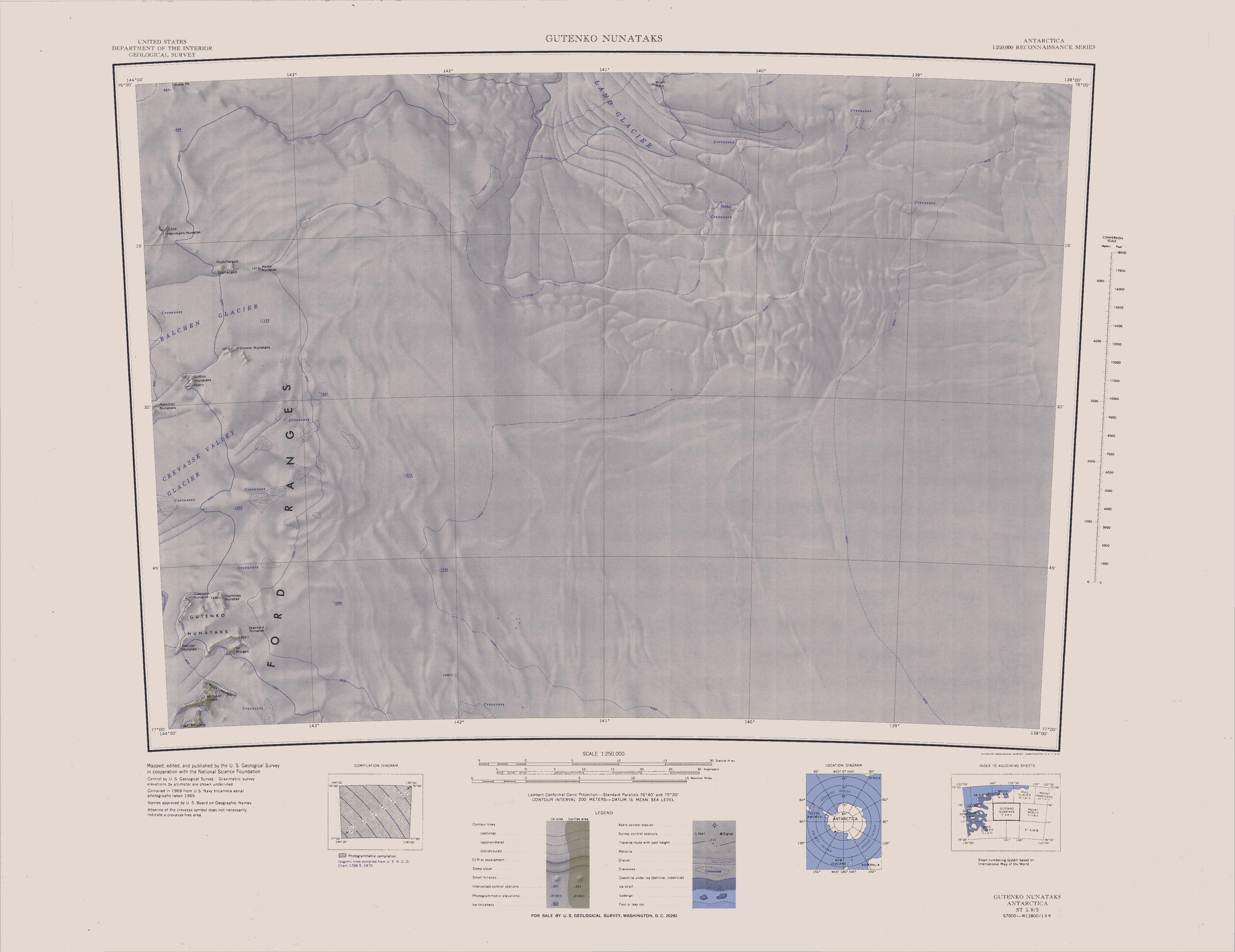
Phillips Mountains in northeast of left map, extending east into right map

The Phillips Mountains are north of the terminus of Balchen Glacier in Block Bay, facing the Fosdick Mountains to the south of the glacier. Hermann Nunatak, Hutcheson Nunataks and Abele Nunatak are to the east and Adams Rocks to the west. Features of the range include, from west to east, Favela Rocks, Webster Bluff, Lewis Rocks, Mount June, Groux Rock, Mount Paige, Mount Carbone and Reddick Nunatak.

== Geography and geology ==
The range spans about 40 miles (64 km) from west to east with elevations near 1000 m. Individual mountains are aligned northeast–southwest or northwest–southeast. Mountains and nunataks are composed of either Ford granodiorite (Devonian age), or Byrd Coast granite (Cretaceous age). Nunataks are mostly found north of the mountain range.

== Discovery and name ==
The Phillips Mountains were discovered by the Byrd Antarctic Expedition (ByrdAE; 1928–30) and named by Richard E. Byrd for Albanus Phillips, Sr., a manufacturer in Cambridge, Maryland, United States, and patron of the Byrd expeditions.

== Features ==
=== Favela Rocks ===
76°12′S 145°21′W. A group of rocks at the northwest end of the Phillips Mountains, 4 nautical miles (7.4 km; 4.6 mi) northwest of Mount June. Mapped by the United States Geological Survey (USGS) from surveys and United States Navy air photos (1959–65). Named by the United States Advisory Committee on Antarctic Names (US-ACAN) for Rafael Favela, Jr., equipment operator, United States Navy, Byrd Station winter party, 1967.

=== Webster Bluff ===
76°06′S 145°03′W. An ice-covered bluff with a steep, rocky north face, 9 nautical miles (17 km; 10 mi) long, forming a northern extension of the Phillips Mountains. Mapped by USGS from surveys and US Navy air photos, 1959-65. Named by US-ACAN for David O. Webster, ionospheric physicist at Byrd Station, 1964.

=== Lewis Rocks ===
76°18′S 145°21′W. An area of rock outcrops 3 nautical miles (5.6 km; 3.5 mi) in extent, at the southwest foot of Mount June. Mapped by USGS from surveys and United States Navy air photos (1959–65). Named by US-ACAN for John H. Lewis, geologist with the USARP Fosdick Mountains party, 1967-68.

=== Mount June ===
76°16′S 145°07′W. A mountain 6 nautical miles (11 km; 6.9 mi) west of Mount Paige. Discovered by the ByrdAE in December 1929, and named for Harold Island June, airplane pilot with the expedition.

=== Groux Rock ===
76°13′S 144°47′W. An isolated rock outcrop in the north part of the Phillips Mountains, 5 nautical miles (9.3 km; 5.8 mi) east-northeast of Mount June. Mapped by USGS from surveys and United States Navy air photos (1959–65). Named by US-ACAN for Roger G. Groux, shipfitter, United States Navy, Byrd Station winter party, 1967.

=== Mount Paige ===
76°20′S 144°42′W. A mountain 3 nautical miles (5.6 km; 3.5 mi) west of Mount Carbone. Discovered and mapped from air photos taken by the ByrdAE (1928–30). Named by US-ACAN for David Paige, artist with the ByrdAE (1933–35).

=== Mount Carbone ===
76°22′S 144°30′W. A mountain 3 nautical miles (5.6 km; 3.5 mi) east of Mount Paige. Discovered and mapped from air photos by the ByrdAE (1928–30). Named by US-ACAN for Al Carbone, cook with the ByrdAE (1933–35).

=== Reddick Nunatak ===
76°17′S 144°01′W. A nunatak in the east part of the Phillips Mountains, 8 nautical miles (15 km; 9.2 mi) east-northeast of Mount Carbone. Mapped by the United States Antarctic Service (USAS; 1939–41) and by USGS from surveys and United States Navy air photos (1959–65). Named by US-ACAN for Warren W. Reddick, Jr., construction electrician, United States Navy, at Byrd Station in 1967.

== Nearby features ==
=== Herrmann Nunatak ===
76°15′S 143°47′W. A nunatak 4 nautical miles (7.4 km; 4.6 mi) northeast of the east end of the Phillips Mountains. Discovered and mapped by the USAS (1939–41). Named by US-ACAN for John Herrmann, photographer with the ByrdAE (1933–35).

=== Hutcheson Nunataks ===
76°17′S 143°27′W. A small group of nunataks along the north side of Balchen Glacier, about midway between the Phillips Mountains and Abele Nunatak. Discovered and mapped by the USAS, 1939–41. Named by US-ACAN for Guy Hutcheson, radio engineer with the ByrdAE 1933-35.

=== Abele Nunatak ===
76°18′S 143°15′W. A nunatak lying 2 nautical miles (3.7 km; 2.3 mi) east of Hutcheson Nunataks at the head of Balchen Glacier, in Marie Byrd Land. Mapped from surveys by the USGS and United States Navy air photos (1959–65). Named by US-ACAN for C.A. Abele, Jr., a member of the ByrdAE (1933–35).

=== Mount Peddie ===
76°01′S 145°01′W. An isolated mountain 5 nautical miles (9.3 km; 5.8 mi) north of Webster Bluff. Mapped from surveys by USGS and U.S. Navy air photos (1959–65). Named by US-ACAN for Norman W. Peddie, geomagnetician and seismologist at Byrd Station, 1964.

=== Adams Rocks ===
76°14′S 145°39′W. Two large rock outcrops that overlook the inner part of Block Bay from northward, located 7 nautical miles (13 km; 8.1 mi) west of Mount June, Phillips Mountains. Mapped by USAS (1939–41) and by USGS from surveys and United States Navy air photos (1959–65). Named by US-ACAN for James G. Adams, builder, United States Navy, of the Byrd Station party, 1967.

== Sources ==
- Alberts, Fred G., ed. (1995), Geographic Names of the Antarctic (PDF) (2 ed.), United States Board on Geographic Names This article incorporates public domain material from websites or documents of the United States Board on Geographic Names.
- Guest Peninsula, USGS: United States Geological Survey
- Gutenko Nunataks, USGS: United States Geological Survey
- Luyendyk, B. P.; et al. (1992), "Recent Progress in Antarctic Earth Science", Proceedings of the 6th Symposium on Antarctic Earth Science, Saitama, Japan: Terra Pub, pp. 279–288
- Richard, S. M.; Smith, C. H.; Kimbrough, D. L.; Fitzgerald, P. G.; Luyendyk, B. P.; McWilliams, M. O. (1994), "Cooling history of the northern Ford Ranges, Marie Byrd Land, West Antarctica", Tectonics, 13 (4): 837–857, Bibcode:1994Tecto..13..837R, doi:10.1029/93tc03322, ISSN 0278-7407
- Wade, F. A.; Cathey, C. A.; Oldham, J. B. (1977), Reconnaissance geologic map of the Guest Peninsula quadrangle, Marie Byrd Land, Antarctica, Map A-7, U. S. Antarctic Research Program, Reston, VA.
- Wade, F. A.; Cathey, C. A.; Oldham, J. B. (1978), Reconnaissance geologic map of the Gutenko Nunataks quadrangle, Marie Byrd Land, Antarctica, Map A-11, U. S. Antarctic Research Program, Reston, VA.
