= Hull Glacier =

Glacier in Antarctica

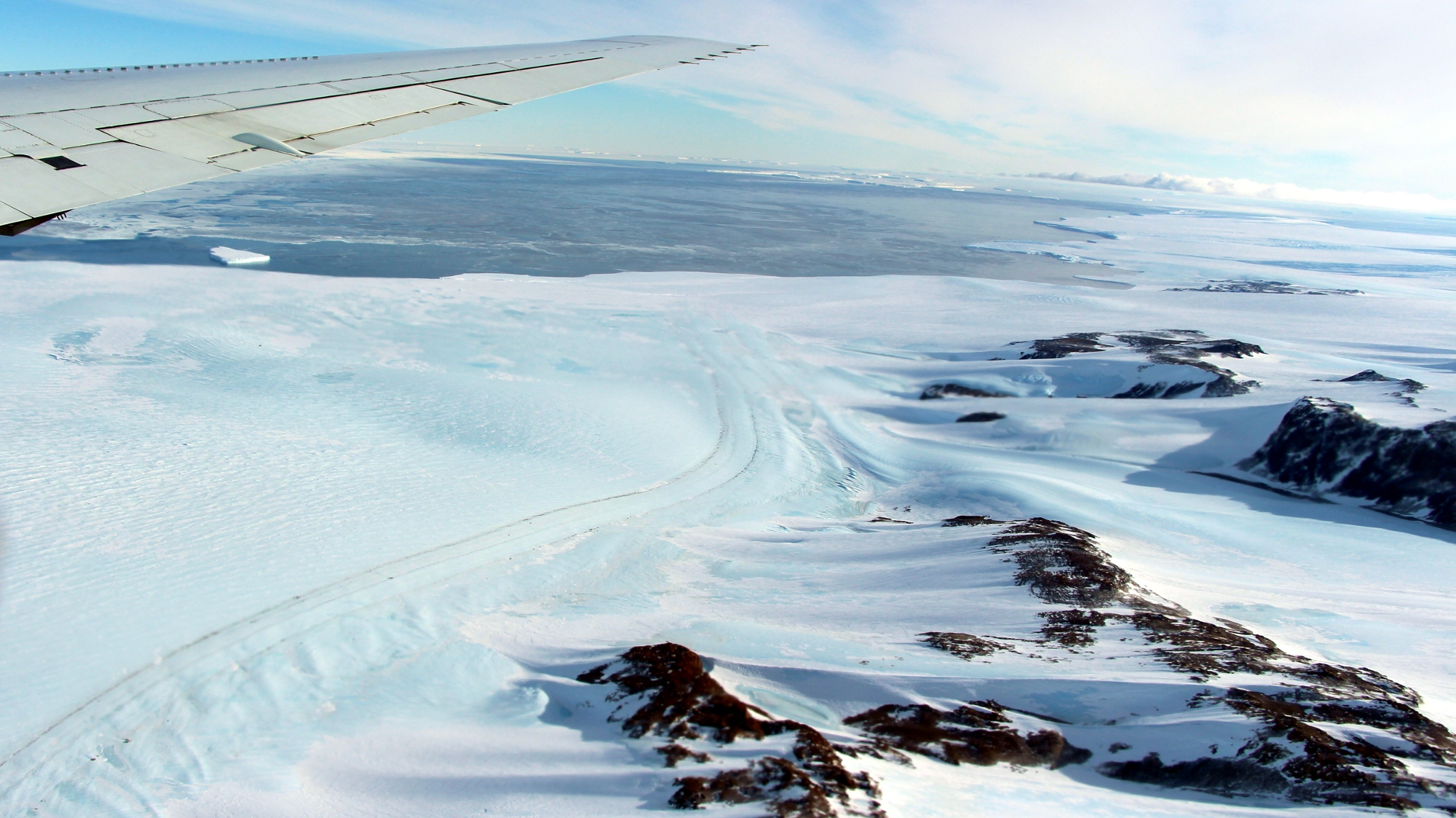
- Hull Glacier

- Location within Antarctica
- Location: Marie Byrd Land, Antarctica
- Coordinates: 75°5′S 137°15′W

The Hull Glacier (75°5′S 137°15′W) is a glacier, about 35 nautical miles (65 km; 40 mi) long, flowing northwest between Mount Giles and Mount Gray into Hull Bay, in Marie Byrd Land, Antarctica.

== Discovery and name ==
The Hull Glacier was discovered by the United States Antarctic Service (USAS; 1939–41) and was named for Cordell Hull, the United States Secretary of State.

== Location ==
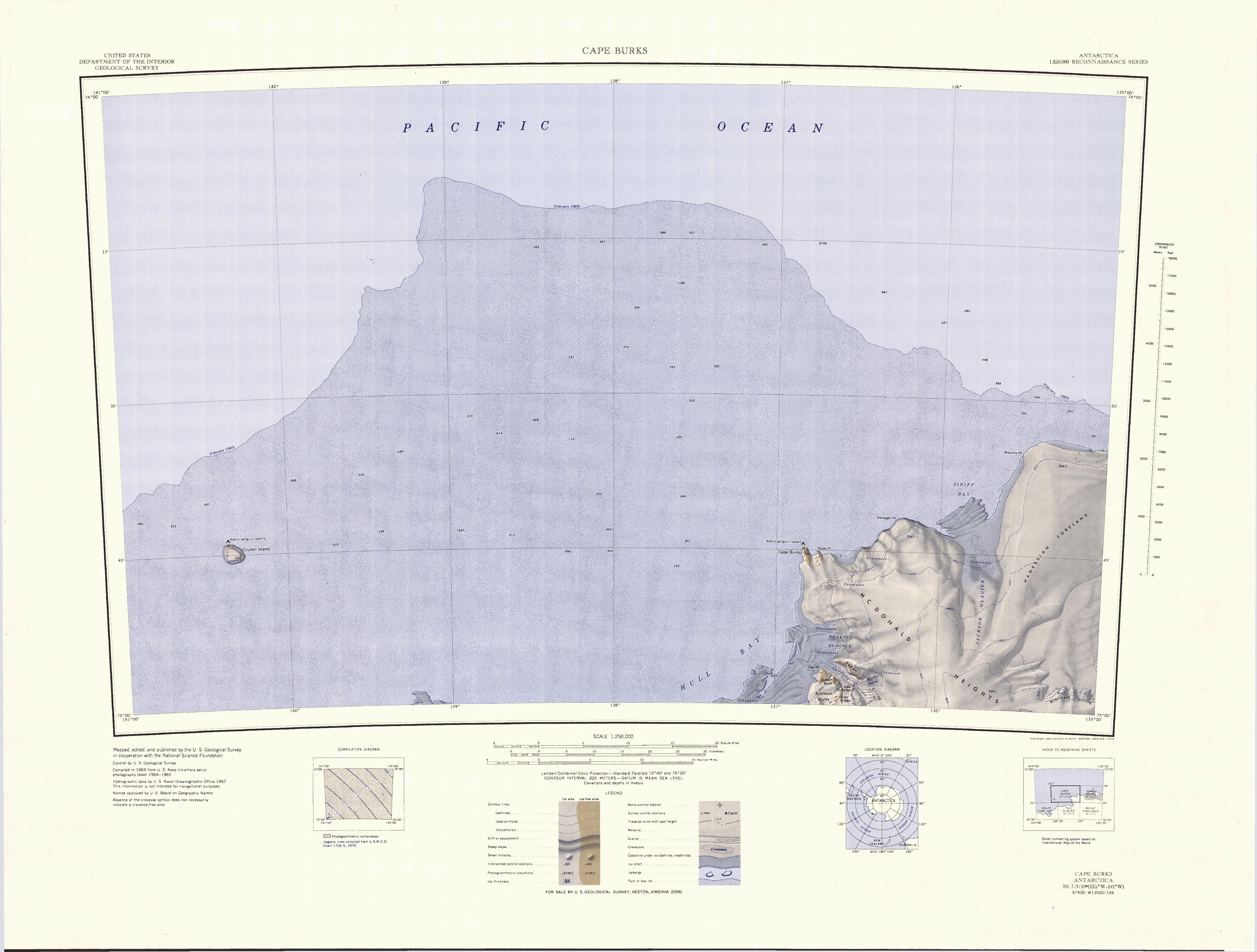
Hull Bay south of map, east of center

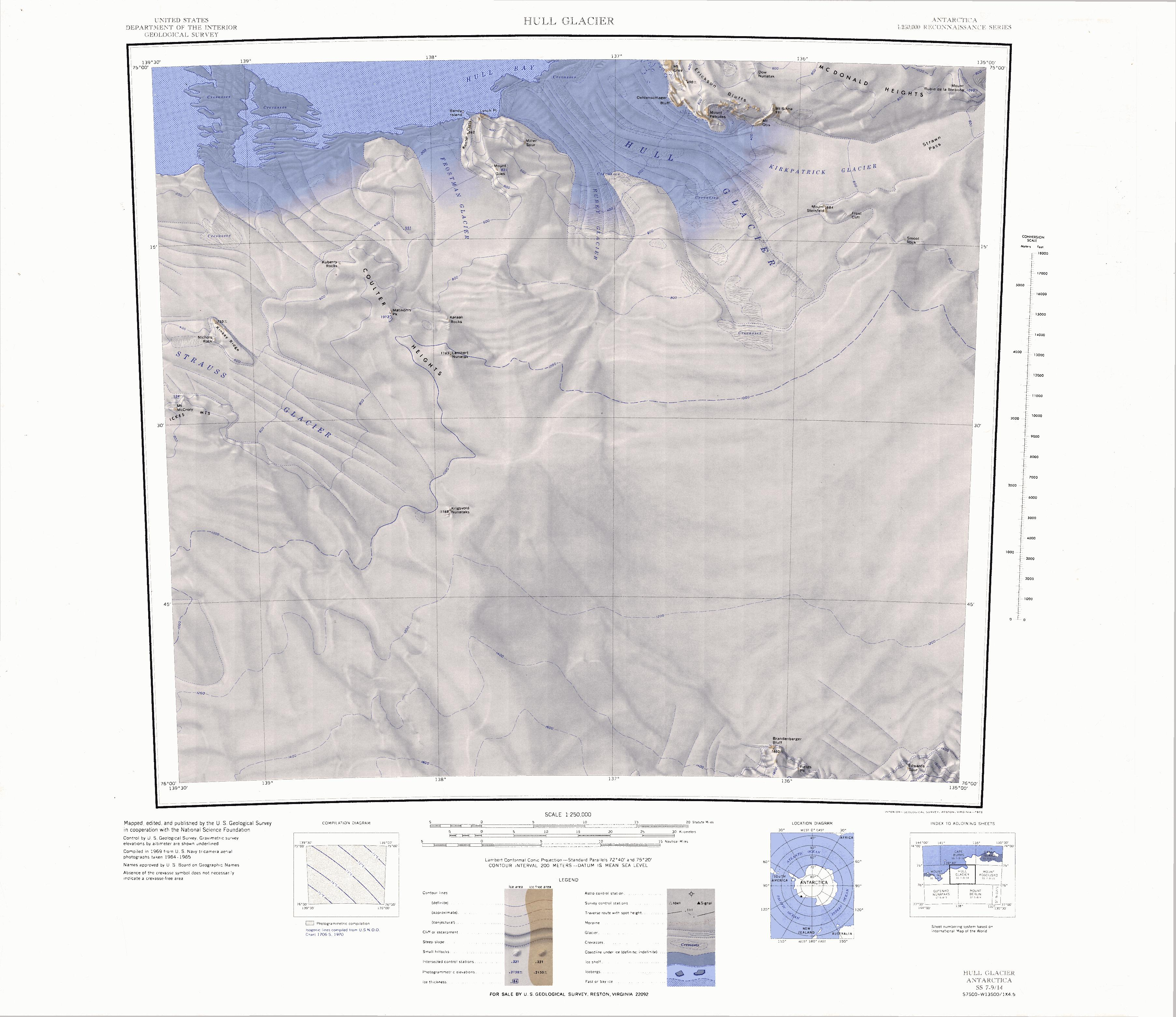
Hull Glacier north of map, east of center

The Hull Glacier flows in a northwest direction to Hull Bay on the coast of Marie Byrd Land. It passes Smoot Rock, Frost Cliff and Mount Steinfeld, which lie to the north. West of Mount Steinfeld it is joined from the right by Kirkpatrick Glacier, which flows down from Strawn Pass to the south of McDonald Heights. The combined glacier flows past the Erickson Bluffs, which lie to the northeast, and is joined from the left by Rubey Glacier. It passes Miller Spur on the southeast and enters Hull Bay just east of Lynch Point.

== Features ==
=== Smoot Rock ===
75°15′S 135°24′W. An isolated rock lying eastward of the head of Hull Glacier, about 7 nautical miles (13 km; 8.1 mi) east-southeast of Mount Steinfeld. Mapped by the United States Geological Survey (USGS) from surveys and United States Navy air photos, 1959-69. Named by the United States Advisory Committee on Antarctic Names (US-ACAN) for Henry T. Smoot, meteorologist at Byrd Station, 1969-70.

=== Frost Cliff ===
75°13′S 135°43′W. A steep, partly ice-covered cliff 2 nautical miles (3.7 km; 2.3 mi) east of Mount Steinfeld, on the south side of the divide between the upper reaches of Hull Glacier and Kirkpatrick Glacier. Mapped by USGS from surveys and United States Navy air photos, 1959-65. Named by US-ACAN for Commander William L. Frost, United States Navy, Officer-in-Charge of Antarctic Support Activities at McMurdo Station, 1970.

=== Mount Steinfeld ===
75°12′S 135°51′W. A mountain 685 metres (2,247 ft) high at the west end of an ice-covered ridge that overlooks the confluence of Hull Glacier and Kirkpatrick Glacier. Mapped by USGS from surveys and United States Navy air photos, 1959-65. Named by US-ACAN for Edward F. Steinfeld, Jr., USARP meteorologist at Byrd Station, 1962.

=== Kirkpatrick Glacier ===
75°09′S 136°00′W. A tributary glacier about 12 nautical miles (22 km; 14 mi) long, flowing west along the south side of McDonald Heights to enter the east side of Hull Glacier. Mapped by USGS from surveys and United States Navy air photos, 1959-65. Named by US-ACAN for Commander Thomas W. Kirkpatrick, USCG, Ship Operations Officer, United States Naval Support Force, Antarctica, during Operation Deep Freeze 1972 and 1973.

=== Strawn Pass ===
75°06′S 135°16′W. A broad pass on the south side of McDonald Heights that connects the heads of Kirkpatrick Glacier and Johnson Glacier, in Marie Byrd Land. Mapped by USGS from surveys and United States Navy air photos, 1959-69. Named by US-ACAN for Lawrence W. Strawn, glaciologist at Byrd Station, 1967-68.

=== Rubey Glacier ===
75°11′S 137°07′W. A broad, heavily crevassed glacier flowing north to coalesce with the west side of Hull Glacier eastward of Mount Giles. Mapped by USGS from surveys and United States Navy air photos, 1959-65. Named by US-ACAN for Captain Ervin B. Rubey, United States Navy, Commander of Antarctic Support Activities at McMurdo Station, summer 1969-70.

== Sources ==
- Alberts, Fred G., ed. (1995), Geographic Names of the Antarctic (PDF) (2 ed.), United States Board on Geographic Names This article incorporates public domain material from websites or documents of the United States Board on Geographic Names.
- Cape Burks, USGS: United States Geological Survey
- Hull Glacier, USGS: United States Geological Survey
- This article incorporates public domain material from websites or documents of the United States Geological Survey.
