= Mount Iphigene =

Mountain in Marie Byrd Land, Antarctica

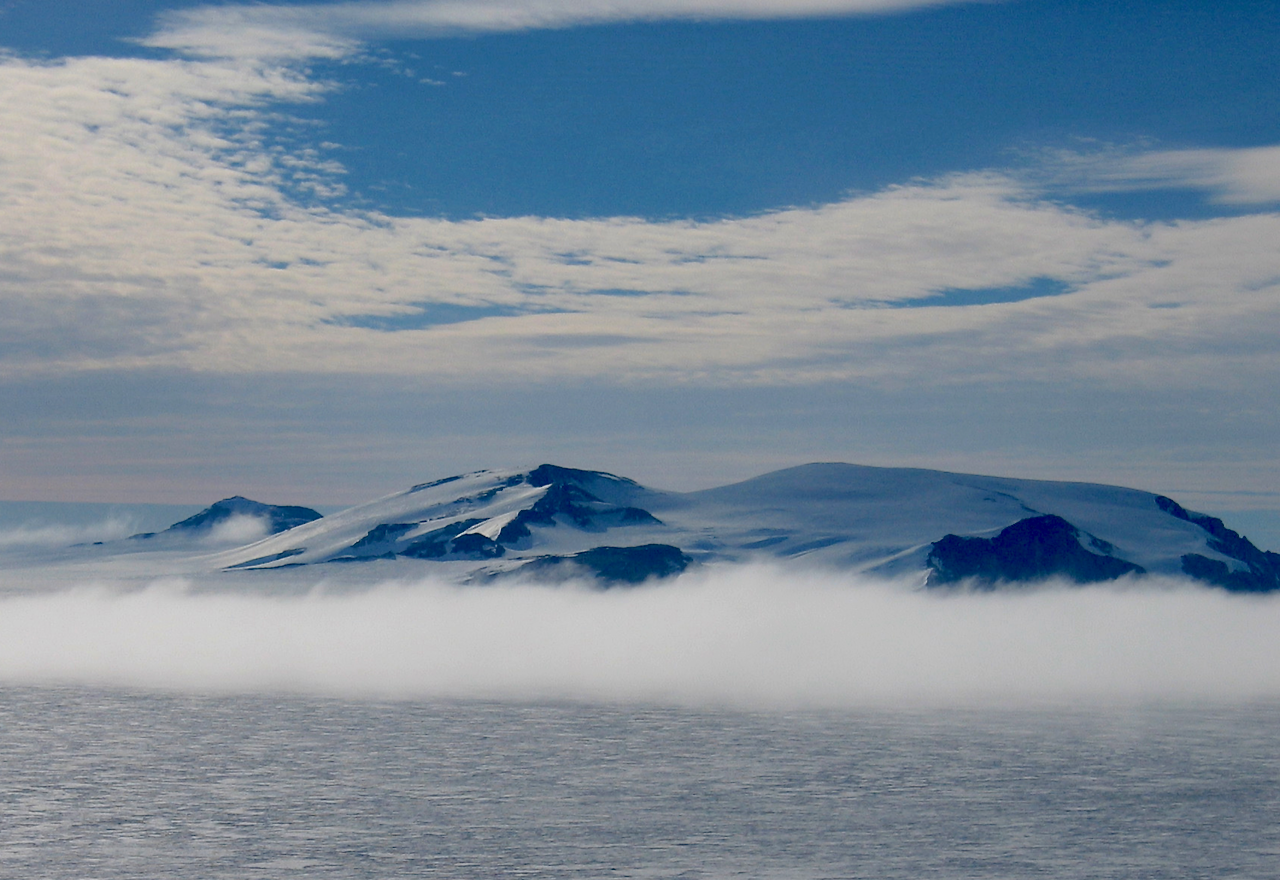
Mount Iphigene, Fosdick Mountains

Mount Iphigene (76°31′S 145°50′W); a mountain just west of Ochs Glacier between Marujupu Peak and Birchall Peaks, in the Fosdick Mountains, Ford Ranges, Marie Byrd Land, Antarctica. It is composed of Fosdick Metamorphic Rocks migmatite and granite of Cretaceous age. Its peak elevation is estimated at 1080 m. Discovered in 1929 by the Byrd Antarctic Expedition, they are named by Byrd for Iphigene Ochs Sulzberger, daughter of Adolph Ochs and wife of Arthur Sulzberger, patrons of the expedition.
