= Miller Spur =

Miller Spur may refer to:

- Miller Spur (Graham Land)
- Miller Spur (Marie Byrd Land)
