= Saunders Coast =

Coast in Marie Byrd Land, Antarctica

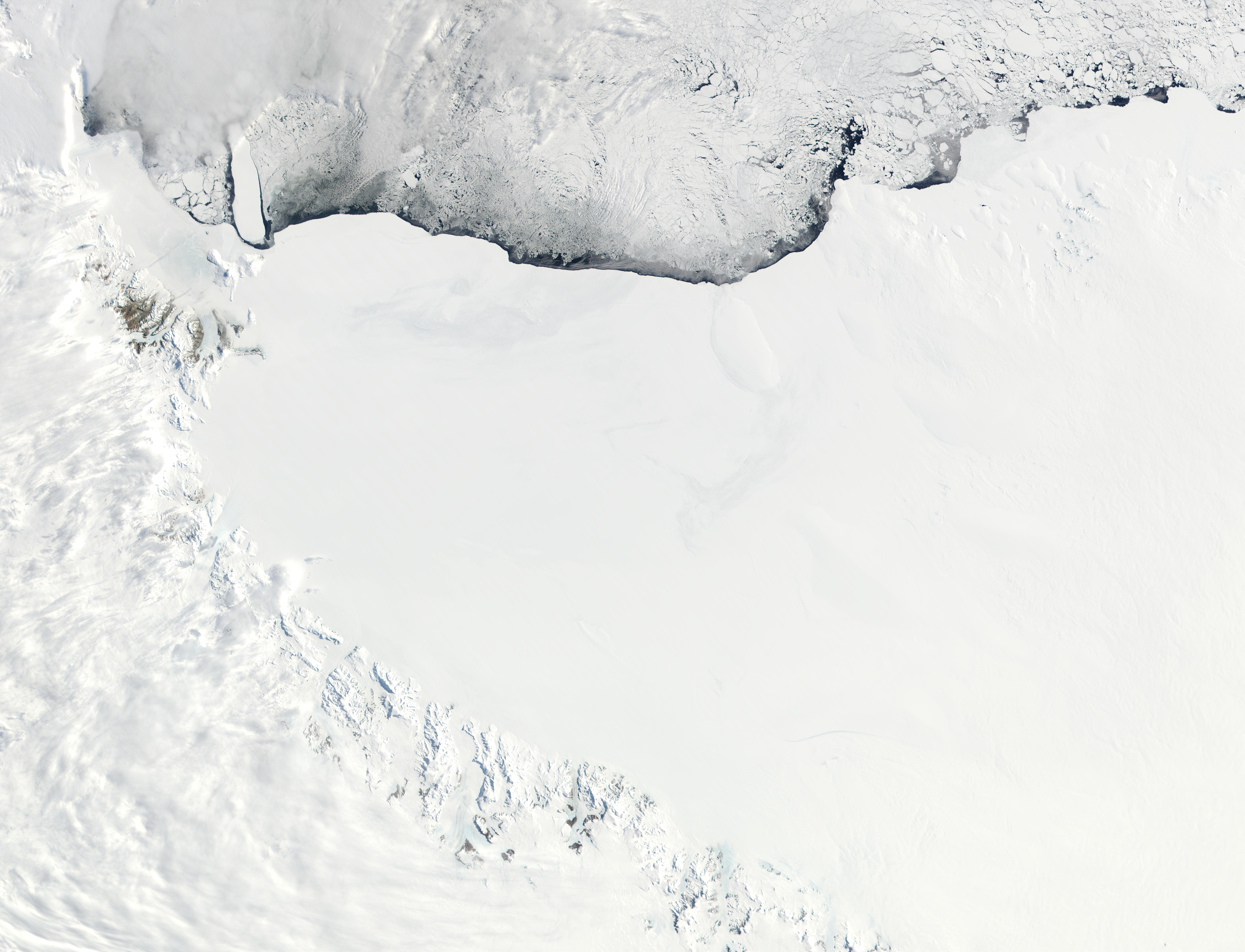
Ross Ice Shelf and Saunders Coast, Antarctica.

Saunders Coast (77°45′S 150°0′W) is the portion of the coast of Marie Byrd Land between Cape Colbeck and Brennan Point, or between Shirase Coast in the west and Ruppert Coast in the east. It stretches from 158°01'W to 146°31'W. The portion west of 150°W is part of Ross Dependency, while the remaining area is unclaimed by any nation. This coast was explored from the air on December 5, 1929, by the Byrd Antarctic Expedition (1928–1930) and was first mapped from aerial photographs obtained on that flight by Capt. Harold E. Saunders, USN, for whom the coast is named. The United States Geological Survey (USGS) completely mapped the coast from ground surveys and U.S. Navy air photos, 1959–1965.

Saunders Basin (76°50′S 155°0′W) is an undersea basin in the central Ross shelf named in association with Saunders Coast. Name approved 6/88 (ACUF 228).
