= Mount Giles (Antarctica) =

Mountain in Marie Byrd Land, Antarctica

- Location within Antarctica

Highest point
- Coordinates: 75°9′S 137°37′W

Mount Giles (75°9′S 137°37′W) is a mainly snow-covered mountain, 820 metres (2,690 ft) high, located 5 nautical miles (9.3 km; 5.8 mi) south-southeast of Lynch Point on the coast of Marie Byrd Land, Antarctica. The mountain is the highest elevation on the divide between the seaward ends of Frostman Glacier and Hull Glacier.

== Discovery and name ==
Mount Giles was discovered on aerial flights from the West Base of the United States Antarctic Service (USAS) in 1940. It was named for Walter R. Giles technical sergeant, United States Marine Corps (USMC), copilot and radio operator on some of these flights.

== Location ==
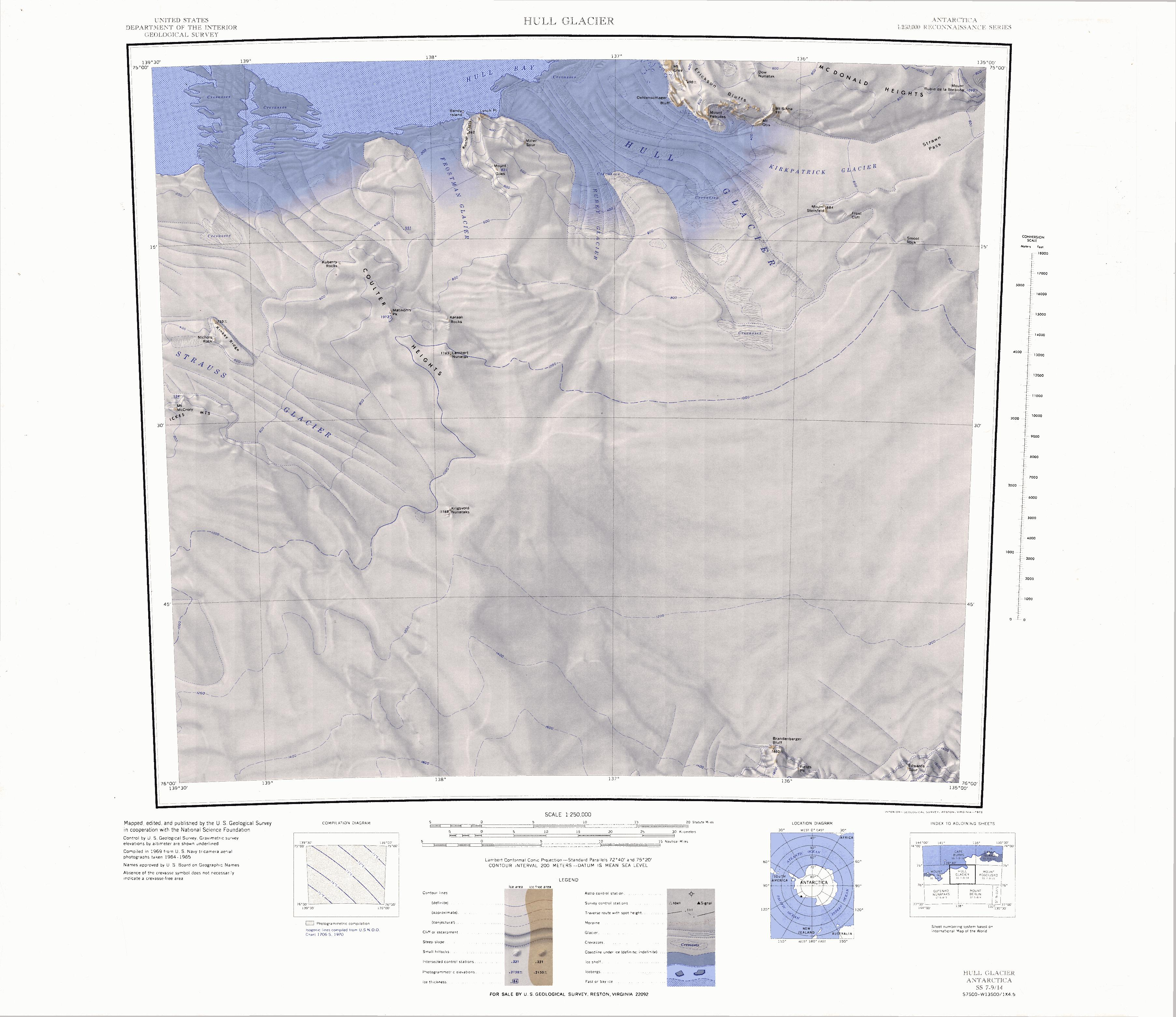
Mount Giles in north of map, to the east of center

Mount Giles is the high point of the divide between Frostman Glacier to the west and Hull Glacier to the east before they enter Hull Bay on the coast of Marie Byrd Land. Other features of the divide include the Konter Cliffs, Lynch Point and Miller Spur.

Layered gabbro crops out at Mount Giles, holding quartz-free plagioclase, clinopyroxene and olivine. Isotope analysis indicates an age of 154±35 million years.

== Features ==
=== Konter Cliffs ===
75°06′S 137°48′W. A line of cliffs, 360 metres (1,180 ft) high, which surmount the east side of the terminus of Frostman Glacier. Mapped by USGS from surveys and United States Navy tricamera aerial photographs, 1959-65. Named by US-ACAN for Richard W. Konter, a member of the ship's party on the City of New York during the ByrdAE, 1928-30.

=== Miller Spur ===
75°07′S 137°29′W. An ice-covered spur that descends northeast from Mount Giles. The spur terminates in a small rock bluff about 1 nautical mile (1.9 km; 1.2 mi) west of lower Hull Glacier. The feature was observed and photographed on December 18, 1940, from aircraft of the USAS (1939-41) led by Admiral Richard Byrd. Named by US-ACAN for Linwood T. Miller, sailmaker and member of the Byrd Antarctic Expedition, 1933-35, who produced windproof shirts, parkas, tents and other canvas materials for the expedition.

== Sources ==
- Alberts, Fred G., ed. (1995), Geographic Names of the Antarctic (PDF) (2 ed.), United States Board on Geographic Names This article incorporates public domain material from websites or documents of the United States Board on Geographic Names.
- Hull Glacier, USGS: United States Geological Survey
- Metcalfe, Anne P.; Sporli, K.B.; Craddock, Campbell (October 1978), "Plutonic rocks from the Ruppert Coast, West Antarctica" (PDF), Antarctic Journal
- This article incorporates public domain material from websites or documents of the United States Geological Survey.
