= Hobbs Coast =

Coast in Marie Byrd Land, West Antarctica

Hobbs Coast (74°50′S 132°0′W) is that portion of the coast of Marie Byrd Land, Antarctica extending from Cape Burks to a point on the coast opposite eastern Dean Island, at 74°42′S 127°05′W, or between the Ruppert Coast in the west and the Bakutis Coast in the east. It stretches from 136°50′W to 127°35′. The coast was discovered by the US Antarctic Service (1939–1941) and named for Professor William H. Hobbs of the University of Michigan, a glaciologist specializing in polar geography and history. The United States Geological Survey completely mapped the coast from ground surveys and U.S. Navy air photos, 1959–1965.
