= Ruppert Coast =

Coast in Marie Byrd Land, Antarctica

Ruppert Coast (75°45′S 141°0′W) is the portion of the coast of Marie Byrd Land, Antarctica, between Brennan Point and Cape Burks, or between Saunders Coast in the west and Hobbs Coast in the east. It stretches from 146°31'W to 136°50'W. It was named by R. Admiral Richard Byrd for Col. Jacob Ruppert of New York, a supporter of the second Byrd Antarctic Expedition (1933–1935) that made the first aerial reconnaissance flight along this coast. The United States Geological Survey (USGS) completely mapped the coast from ground surveys and U.S. Navy air photos, 1959–1965.

The former Russian station Russkaya is located on Ruppert Coast.
