= Nickerson Ice Shelf =

Ice shelf in Antarctica

- Ice shelf
- Location within Antarctica
- Coordinates: 75°45′S 145°00′W
- Location: Marie Byrd Land, Antarctica
- Water bodies: Southern Ocean

Nickerson Ice Shelf (75°45′S 145°00′W), is an ice shelf about 35 nautical miles (65 km; 40 mi) wide, lying north of Siemiatkowski Glacier and the western part of Ruppert Coast, Marie Byrd Land, Antarctica.

== Discovery and name ==
The Nickerson Ice Shelf was first observed and roughly mapped by the Byrd Antarctic Expedition (ByrdAE) (1928-30). It was named by the United States Advisory Committee on Antarctic Names (US-ACAN) for Commander H.J. Nickerson, United States Navy, administrative officer on the staff of the Commander, Task Force 43, during Operation Deep Freeze 1966.

== Features ==
=== Newman Island ===
75°39′S 145°30′W. An ice-covered island 15 nautical miles (28 km; 17 mi) long, lying in the Nickerson Ice Shelf. Mapped from surveys by the United States Geological Survey (USGS) and United States Navy air photos (1959-65). Named by US-ACAN for Commander J.F. Newman, United States Navy, ships officer on the staff of the Commander, Task Force 43, during Deep Freeze 1966.

=== Stephen Island ===
75°50′S 146°54′W. An ice-covered island about 4 nautical miles (7.4 km; 4.6 mi) long lying at the west side of Nickerson Ice Shelf. Mapped from surveys by the USGS and United States Navy air photos (1959-65). Named by US-ACAN for Alexander Stephen (1795-1875), Scottish shipbuilder of Alexander Stephen and Sons, whose firm built the Terra Nova (1884), the Nimrod (1866) and the Bear (1874), used respectively by Captain Robert Falcon Scott, Sir Ernest Shackleton and Admiral Richard E. Byrd in their expeditions to the Antarctic.

=== Siemiatkowski Glacier ===
75°54′S 144°12′W. A glacier about 25 nautical miles (46 km; 29 mi) long, flowing northwest to Nickerson Ice Shelf. Mapped from surveys by the USGS and United States Navy air photos (1959-65). Named by US-ACAN for Edmond R. Siemiatkowski, auroral physicist at Byrd Station, 1964.

=== Blake Peak ===
76°01′S 143°44′W. An isolated peak on the southwest side of Siemiatkowski Glacier. Mapped from surveys by the USGS and United States Navy air photos (1959-65). Named by US-ACAN for Dale G. Blake, ionospheric scientist at Byrd Station, 1964.

== Sources ==
- Alberts, Fred G., ed. (1995), Geographic Names of the Antarctic (PDF) (2 ed.), United States Board on Geographic Names This article incorporates public domain material from websites or documents of the United States Board on Geographic Names.
- This article incorporates public domain material from websites or documents of the United States Geological Survey.
