= McDonald Heights =

Mountain peaks in Marie Byrd Land, Antarctica

- Location within Antarctica

Highest point
- Elevation: 1,000 m (3,300 ft)

Geography
- Range coordinates: 74°55′S 136°0′W

The McDonald Heights (74°55′S 136°0′W) are broad, mainly snow-covered heights about 35 nautical miles (65 km) long and rising over 1,000 metres (3,300 ft) between Cape Burks and Morris Head on the coast of Marie Byrd Land, Antarctica. The heights are bounded southward by Hull Glacier, Kirkpatrick Glacier and Johnson Glacier.

== Discovery and name ==
The McDonald Heights were photographed from aircraft of the United States Antarctic Service (USAS), 1939–1941. They were observed and partially mapped from USS Glacier during February 1962, and were mapped in detail by the United States Geological Survey (USGS) in 1965. The heights were named by the United States Advisory Committee on Antarctic Names (US-ACAN) after Captain Edwin A. McDonald, United States Navy, Deputy Commander of the United States Naval Support Force, Antarctica, in 1962, and Commander of the Task Unit that explored this coast aboard Glacier in February 1962.

== Location ==
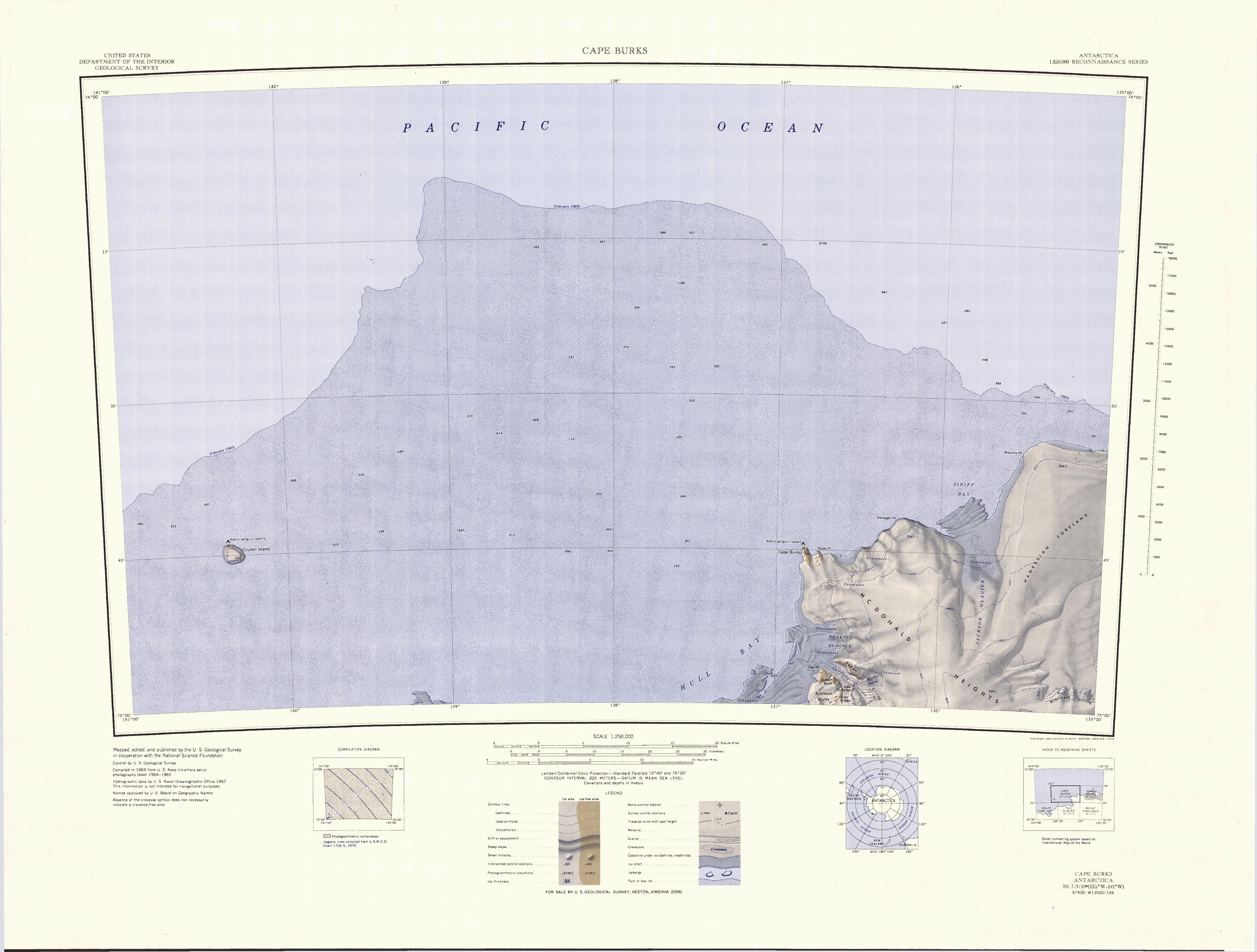
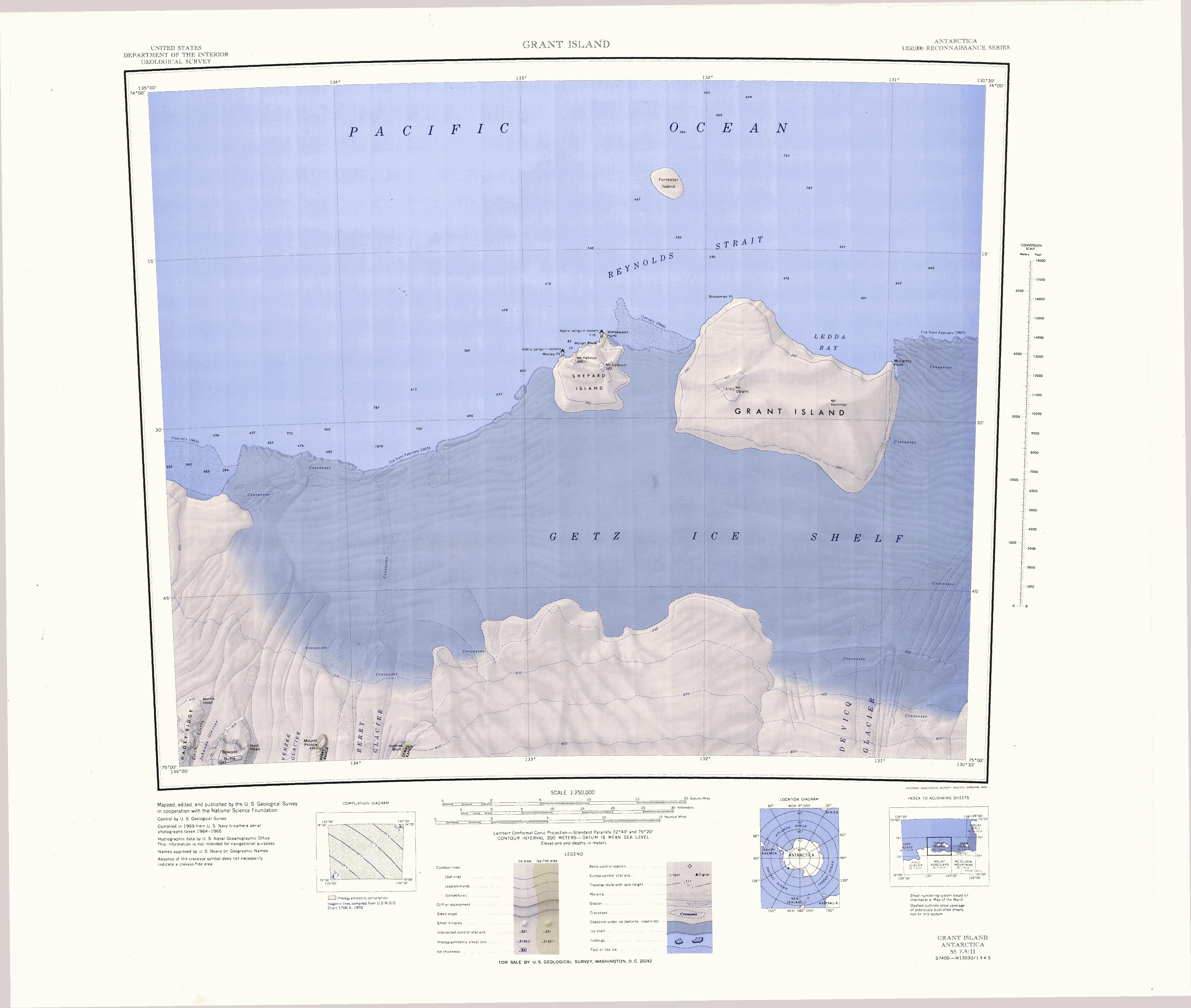
Northern part of McDonald Heights in south center of maps

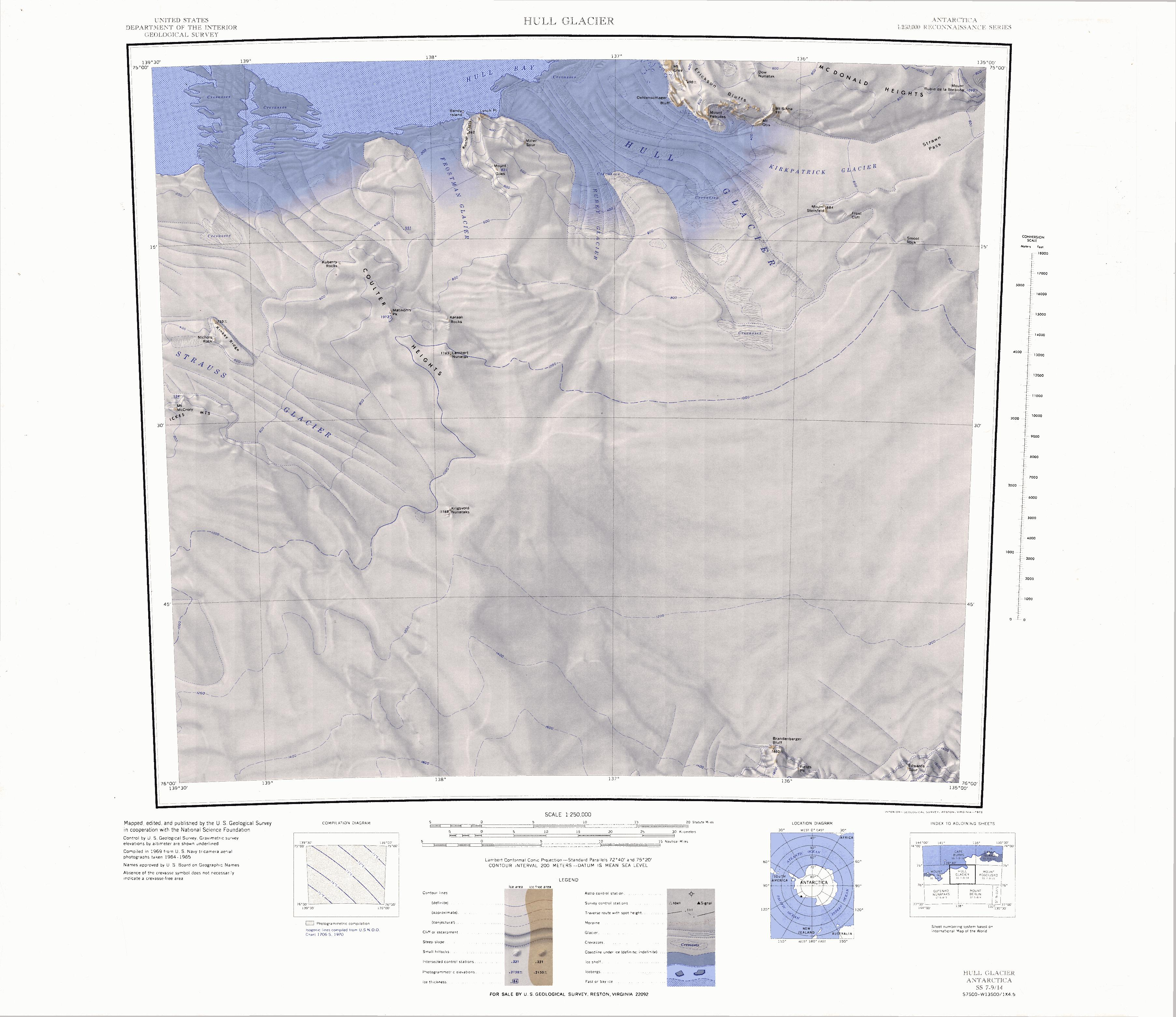
Southern part of McDonald Heights in northeast of map

The McDonald Heights extend east from Cape Burks, the easternmost point of Hull Bay, along the north side of Hull Glacier and its tributary Kirkpatrick Glacier to Johnson Glacier in the east. The Jackson Glacier flows north from the heights into Siniff Bay. In the north east the Björnert Cliffs face north towards the Hanessian Foreland, extending to Hagey Ridge, Morris Head and the Zilch Cliffs along the west side of Johnson Glacier. In west the Peden Cliffs face the Ericson Bluffs, including Cox Point, Gilbert Bluff, Dee Nunatak and Coor Crags. In the southwest the Ericson Bluffs include Mount Grey, Oehlenschlager Bluff, Dow Nunatak, Mount Petrides, Mount Otis and Mount Sinha. Mount Rubin de la Borbolla is in the southeast.

== Eastern features ==
=== Björnert Cliffs ===
74°58′S 135°09′W. A series of ice-covered cliffs which face seaward along the northern side of McDonald Heights. The cliffs stand between Hanessian Foreland and Hagey Ridge and descend abruptly from about 800 metres (2,600 ft) high, the average summit elevation, to 400 metres (1,300 ft) high at the base. The feature was photographed from aircraft of the United States Antarctic Service, 1939-41, and was mapped by USGS from surveys and United States Navy air photos, 1959-66. Named by US-ACAN (1974) for Rolf P. Bjornert of the Office of Polar Programs, National Science Foundation, who served in the capacity of Station Projects Manager for Antarctica.

=== Hagey Ridge ===
74°57′S 134°56′W. High snow-covered ridge, between Bjornert Cliffs and Johnson Glacier, forming the east end of McDonald Heights. The ridge was first photographed from aircraft of the United States Antarctic Service in December 1940. It was mapped by USGS from surveys and United States Navy air photos, 1959-66. Named by US-ACAN for Lieutenant Donald W. Hagey, United States Navy, Officerin-Charge at Byrd Station in 1969.

=== Morris Head ===
74°54′S 134°50′W. Ice-covered headland marking the seaward end of Hagey Ridge and northeast extremity of McDonald Heights. The headland was photographed from aircraft of the US AS on December 18, 1940, and was mapped by USGS from surveys and United States Navy air photos, 1959-65. Named by US-ACAN for Lloyd Morris, QMC, United States Navy, Chief Quartermaster and senior member of the bathythermograph team aboard USS Glacier in exploring this coast, 1961-62.

=== Zilch Cliffs ===
74°58′S 134°55′W. A series of steep cliffs that mark the east extremity of McDonald Heights. The cliffs were photographed from aircraft of US AS, 1939-41, and were mapped in detail from United States Navy air photos and USGS surveys, 1959-65. Named by US-ACAN for Lieutenant Commander C.H. Zilch, United States Navy, Officer-in-Charge of the meteorological support unit during Operation Deep Freeze 1966.

=== Mount Rubin de la Borbolla ===
75°02′S 135°03′W. An ice-covered mountain 1,090 metres (3,580 ft) high in the southeast extremity of McDonald Heights, overlooking Johnson Glacier from the west. Mapped by USGS from surveys and United States Navy air photos, 1959-65. Named by US-ACAN for George S. Rubin de la Borbolla, meteorologist at Plateau Station, 1968.

== Western features ==
=== Ericson Bluffs ===
75°02′S 136°30′W. A series of conspicuous rock bluffs extending from Gilbert Bluff to Mount Sinha, forming the southwest edge of McDonald Heights. A portion of the bluffs were photographed from aircraft of the US AS, 1939-41. They were mapped by USGS from surveys and United States Navy air photos, 1959-65. Named by US-ACAN for Albert W. Erickson, leader of a biology party that made population studies of seals, whales, and birds in the pack ice of the Bellingshausen and Amundsen Seas using USCGC Southwind and its two helicopters, 1971-72.

=== Gilbert Bluff ===
74°58′S 136°37′W. A rock bluff with abrupt cliff faces on the north and east sides, located on the south side of Garfield Glacier and near the north margin of Erickson Bluffs. Mapped by USGS from surveys and United States Navy air photos, 1959-65. Named by US-ACAN for James R. Gilbert, member of the biological party that made population studies of seals, whales and birds in the pack ice of the Bellingshausen and Amundsen Seas using USCGC Southwind and its two helicopters, 1971-72.

=== Coor Crags ===
74°29′S 136°36′W. Several rock crags standing 3.5 nautical miles (6.5 km; 4.0 mi) high, southeast of Cox Point in the north part of Erickson Bluffs. The feature was first observed and photographed from aircraft of the USAS, 1939^41. Mapped by the USGS from surveys and United States Navy air photos, 1959-65. Named by US-ACAN for Lieutenant Commander Lawrence W. Coor, United States Navy, pilot of LC-130 Hercules aircraft during Operation Deep Freeze 1970 and 1971.

=== Mount Gray ===
75°01′S 136°42′W. A rounded, ice-worn mountain on the southwest part of McDonald Heights. It stands on the east side of Hull Glacier, 2 nautical miles (3.7 km; 2.3 mi) north of Oehlenschlager Bluff. Discovered on aerial flights from the West Base of the USAS in 1940, and named for Orville Gray, aviation machinist's mate, plane captain on these flights.

=== Oehlenschlager Bluff ===
75°03′S 136°42′W. A steep rock bluff overlooking Hull Glacier from the north. It marks the southwest extremity of Erickson Bluffs and McDonald Heights. Mapped by USGS from surveys and United States Navy air photos, 1959-65. Named by US-ACAN for Richard J. Oehlenschlager, member of the biological party that made population studies of seals, whales, and birds in the pack ice of the Bellingshausen and Amundsen Seas using USCGC Southwind and its two helicopters, 1971-72.

=== Dow Nunatak ===
75°01′S 136°14′W. A small, relatively isolated nunatak 3.5 nautical miles (6.5 km; 4.0 mi) northwest of Mount Sinha in the southwest part of McDonald Heights. Mapped by USGS from surveys and United States Navy air photos, 1959-65. Named by US-ACAN for Charles R. Dow, who participated in glaciological research at Byrd Station, 1969-70.

=== Mount Petrides ===
75°04′S 136°30′W. A mountain with much exposed rock midway between Oehlenschlager Bluff and Mount Sinha, in southern Erickson Bluffs. It overlooks the confluence of Kirkpatrick and Hull Glaciers from the north. Mapped by USGS from surveys and United States Navy air photos, 1959-65. Named by US-ACAN for George A. Petrides, member of the biological party that made population studies of seals, whales and birds in the pack ice of the Bellingshausen and Amundsen Seas using USCGC Southwind and its two helicopters, 1971-72.

=== Mount Otis ===
75°05′S 136°13′W. A small rocky summit along the north side of Kirkpatrick Glacier. The feature is 1.5 nautical miles (2.8 km; 1.7 mi) southwest of Mount Sinha at the southeast margin of Erickson Bluffs. Mapped by USGS from surveys and United States Navy air photos, 1959-65. Named by US-ACAN for Jack Otis, member of the biological party that made population studies of seals, whales, and birds in the pack ice of the Bellingshausen and Amundsen Seas using USCGC Southwind and its two helicopters, 1971-72.

=== Mount Sinha ===
75°04′S 136°09′W. A mountain 990 metres (3,250 ft) high at the southeast extremity of Erickson Bluffs in the south part of McDonald Heights. It overlooks lower Kirkpatrick Glacier from the north in Marie Byrd Land. Mapped by USGS from surveys and United States Navy air photos, 1959-65. Named by US-ACAN for A.A. Sinha, member of the biological party that made population studies of seals, whales and birds in the pack ice of the Bellingshausen and Amundsen Seas using USCGC Southwind and its two helicopters, 1971-72.

== Sources ==
- Alberts, Fred G., ed. (1995), Geographic Names of the Antarctic (PDF) (2 ed.), United States Board on Geographic Names This article incorporates public domain material from websites or documents of the United States Board on Geographic Names.
- Cape Burks, USGS: United States Geological Survey
- Grant Island, USGS: United States Geological Survey
- Hull Glacier, USGS: United States Geological Survey
- This article incorporates public domain material from websites or documents of the United States Geological Survey.
