= Orville Lee Bandy =

American geologist (1917–1973)

Orville Lee Bandy (31 March 1917 – 2 August 1973) was an American geologist and a professor at the University of Southern California. He specialized in Cenozoic stratigraphy, benthic foraminifera and palaeoclimate studies.

Bandy was born in Linden, Iowa and grew up in Corvallis, Oregon. He went to Oregon State University for his BS and MS degrees and worked in the United States Army Air Forces from 1942 to 1946. He then worked in the Humble Oil and Refining Company, Houston before joining for a PhD in 1946 under Jesse James Galloway at the Indiana University Bloomington. He joined the University of Southern California in 1948 as a professor and worked there until his death. He died from acute leukemia at Inglewood, California.

== Legacy ==
There is an island off Hull bay in Antarctica named after him.
