= Rockefeller Plateau =

Coordinates: 80°0′S 135°0′W

The Rockefeller Plateau in Antarctica is the portion of the interior ice plateau of Marie Byrd Land lying eastward of the Shirase Coast and Siple Coast and southward of the Ford Ranges, Flood Range and the Executive Committee Range, centering near the coordinates given above. Much of its extensive, ice-covered surface is from 1,000 meters to 1,500 meters above sea level. It was discovered by Rear Admiral Richard E. Byrd in 1934 and named for John D. Rockefeller Jr., patron of the Byrd expeditions.
