= Block Bay =

Bay in Antarctica

- Location within Antarctica
- Location: Marie Byrd Land, Antarctica
- Coordinates: 76°15′S 146°22′W
- Ocean/sea sources: Pacific Ocean

Block Bay (76°15′S 146°22′W) is a long ice-filled bay lying east of Guest Peninsula along the coast of Marie Byrd Land, Antarctica.

== Discovery and name ==
Block Bay was discovered in 1929 by the Byrd Antarctic Expedition (ByrdAE), and named by Richard E. Byrd for Paul Block, newspaper publisher and patron of the expedition.

== Location ==
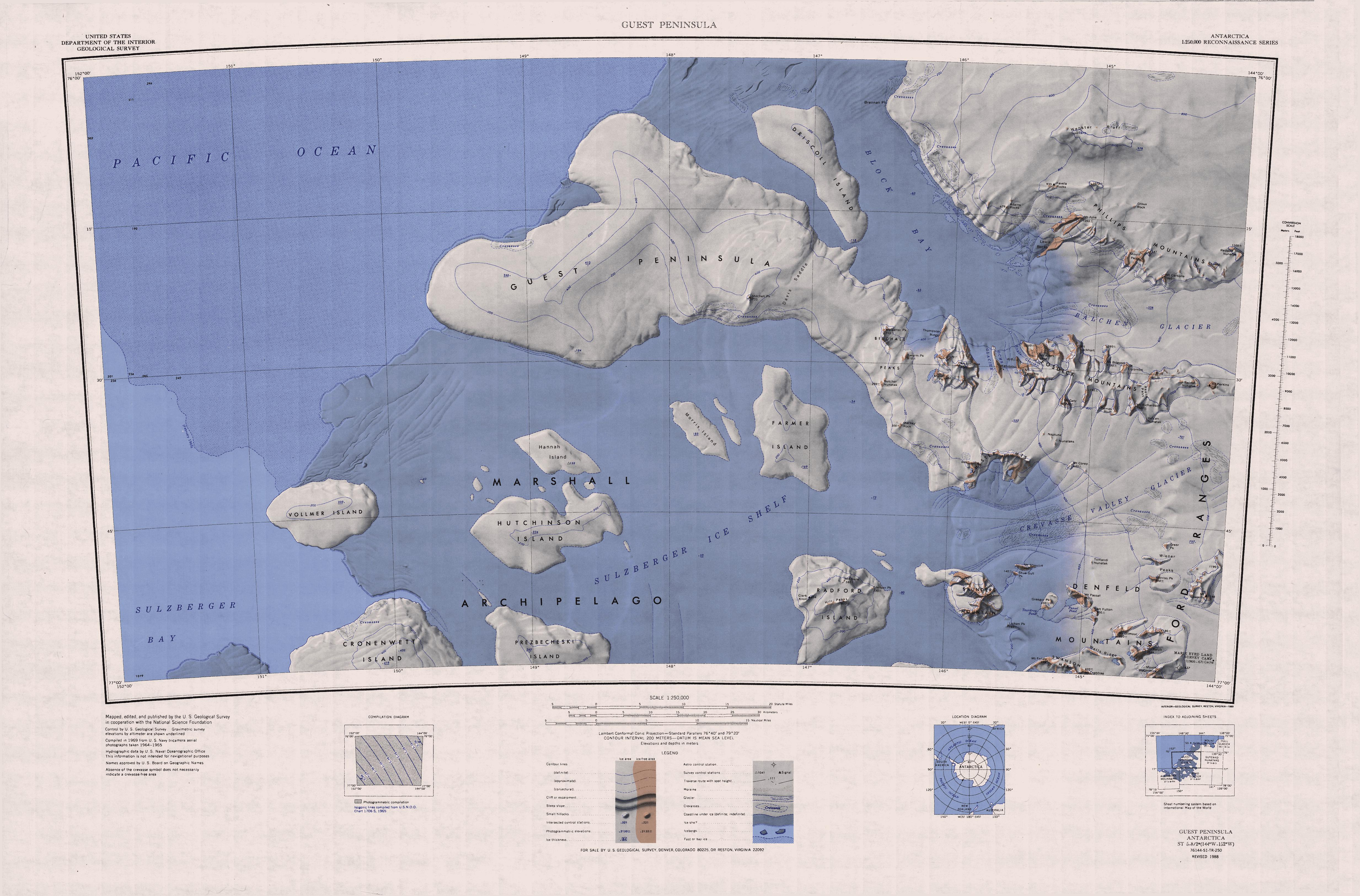
Block Bay in northeast of map

Block Bay is on the Pacific Ocean coast of Marie Byrd Land, east of the Guest Peninsula and the Fosdick Mountains, and west of the Phillips Mountains. Driscoll Island lies in the mouth of the bay, to the west of Brennan Point. The Balchen Glacier drains into the head of the bay. The Weikman Nunataks, Griffith Nunataks and O'Connor Nunataks are south of the head of this glacier. The Ragle Glacier and Ochs Glacier drain into the bay from either side of Mount Ferranto in the Fosdick Mountains.

== Features ==
=== Driscoll Island ===
76°12′S 146°55′W. A narrow, ice-covered island 16 nautical miles (30 km; 18 mi) long, lying in Block Bay. The feature was partially delineated from air photos taken by the ByrdAE (1928–30) on the flight of December 5, 1929. The island was completely mapped by the United States Geological Survey (USGS), 1959–65. Named by the United States Advisory Committee on Antarctic Names (US-ACAN) after Lawrence J. Driscoll, BM1, United States Navy, Boatswain's Mate aboard USS Glacier along this coast, 1961–62.

=== Brennan Point ===
76°05′S 146°31′W. An ice-covered point forming the east side of the entrance to Block Bay. Discovered on the ByrdAE (1928–30) flight along this coast on December 5, 1929. Named for Michael J. Brennan, who was advisory on the ByrdAE (1928–30) in the selection of personnel. Brennan was skipper of the Chantier on the trip to the Arctic when R. Admiral R.E. Byrd flew over the North Pole.

=== Balchen Glacier ===
76°23′S 145°10′W. A crevassed glacier flowing west to Block Bay between the Phillips Mountains and Fosdick Mountains. Discovered on December 5, 1929, by the ByrdAE and named by Byrd for Bernt Balchen, chief pilot of the expedition.

=== Weikman Nunataks ===
76°30′S 143°59′W. Two nunataks on the divide separating the upper reaches of Balchen Glacier and Crevasse Valley Glacier. The nunataks lie 2 nautical miles (3.7 km; 2.3 mi) east of Mount Perkins. First mapped by the United States Antarctic Service (USAS), 1939–41. Named by US-ACAN for Edward R. Weikman Jr., CMH2, United States Navy, Construction Mechanic at Byrd Station, 1967.

=== Griffith Nunataks ===
76°28′S 143°45′W. A group of rock exposures on the south side of Balchen Glacier between O'Connor Nunataks and Mount Perkins. Discovered by the USAS in aerial flights over this area in 1940, and named for Clyde W. Griffith, machinist and tractor operator of this expedition.

=== O'Connor Nunataks ===
76°26′S 143°25′W. A group of rock exposures rising above the ice near the head of Balchen Glacier, 5 nautical miles (9.3 km; 5.8 mi) northeast of Griffith Nunataks. Discovered by the USAS in aerial flights over this area in 1940. Named for Raymond O'Connor, a member of the West Base of the USAS (1939–41).

=== Ragle Glacier ===
76°28′S 145°32′W. A small glacier that drains the west end of the Fosdick Mountains, between Mount Ferranto and Mount Avers, and flows northwest to Block Bay. The glacier was photographed by the USAS (1939–41), led by Admiral Byrd, and was mapped by the USGS from surveys and United States Navy air photos (1959–65). Named for Doctor B. Harrison Ragle, Admiral Byrd's personal physician in the late 1930s, who made financial contributions toward purchase of first aid equipment and medical supplies for US AS (1939–41) and was a consultant on medical matters for that expedition.

=== Ochs Glacier ===
76°30′S 145°35′W. A glacier flowing to the head of Block Bay between Mount Iphigene and Mount Avers. Discovered by the ByrdAE in 1929, and named for Adolph S. Ochs, publisher of the New York Times, a patron of the expedition.

== Sources ==
- Alberts, Fred G., ed. (1995), Geographic Names of the Antarctic (PDF) (2 ed.), United States Board on Geographic Names This article incorporates public domain material from websites or documents of the United States Board on Geographic Names.
- Guest Peninsula, USGS: United States Geological Survey
