= Fosdick Mountains =

Mountain range in Marie Byrd Land, Antarctica

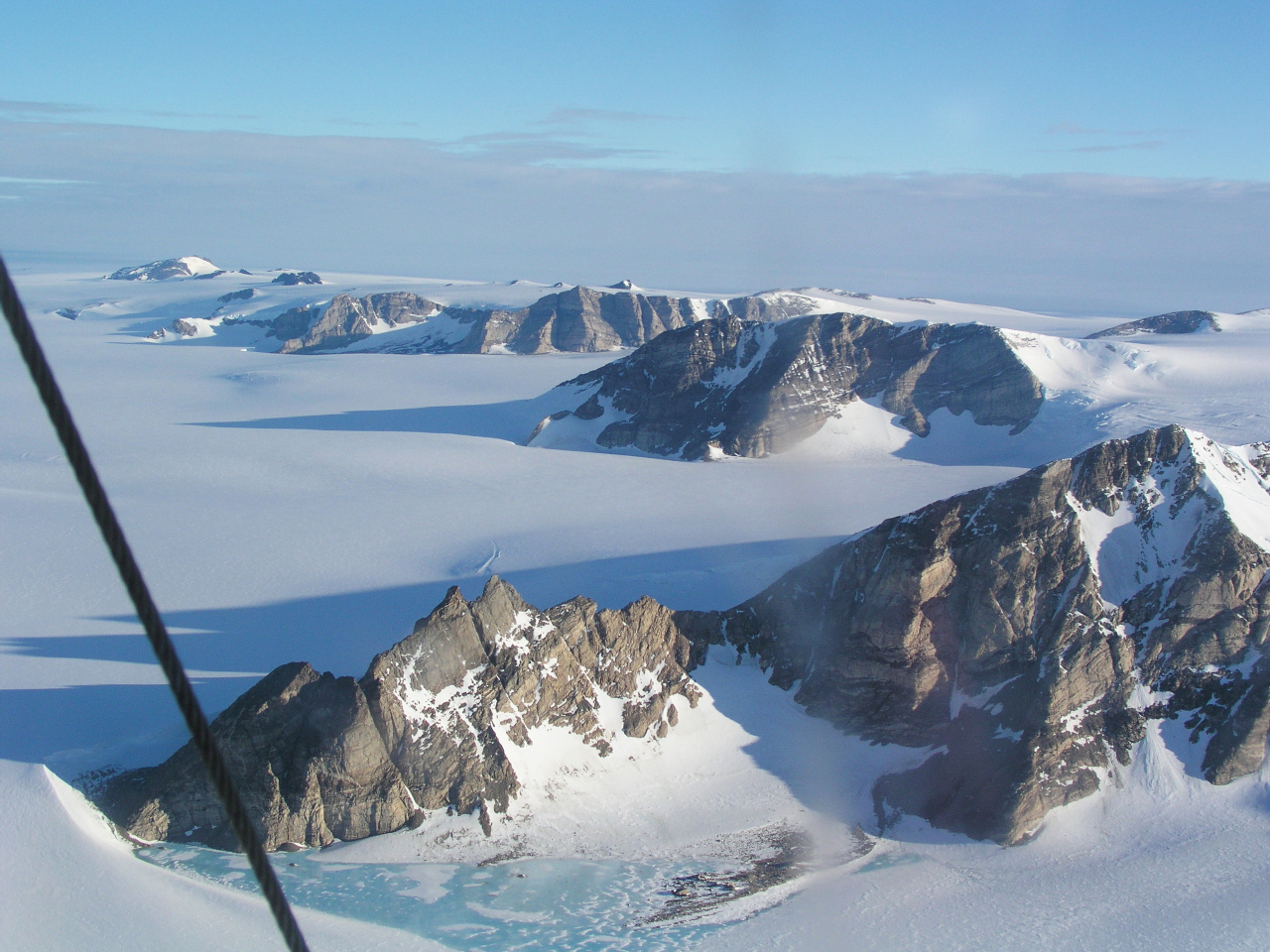
- Aerial view to the east of north escarpment, Fosdick Mountains. Mount Bitgood in the near field, Mount Colombo middle distance, Mount Perkins is the peak at the horizon.

Geography
- Location within Antarctica
- Continent: Antarctica
- Area: Marie Byrd Land
- Range coordinates: 76°32′S 144°45′W
- Parent range: Ford Ranges

The Fosdick Mountains (76°32′S 144°45′W) are an east–west trending mountain range with marked serrate outlines, standing along the south side of Balchen Glacier at the head of Block Bay, in the Ford Ranges of Marie Byrd Land, Antarctica.

== Location ==
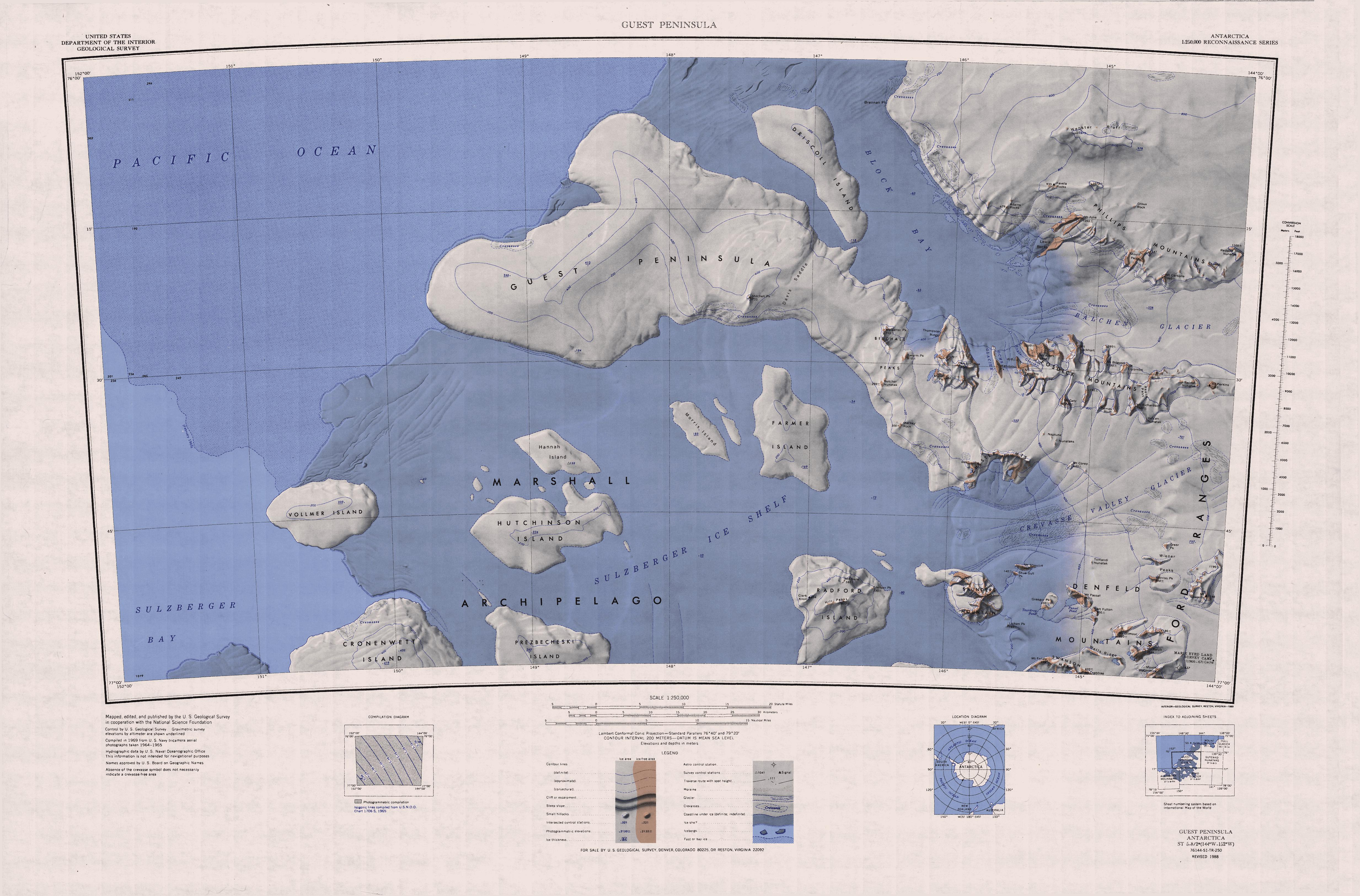
Guest Peninsula. Fosdick Mountains on northeast of the peninsula.

The Fosdick Mountains are on the north side of the base of the Guest Peninsula. The Balchen Glacier enters Block Bay to their north, and the Crevasse Valley Glacier flows past their south to enter the Sulzberger Ice Shelf. Northern features from west to east include Mount Avers, Mount Lockhart, Mount Bitgood, Mount Colombo, Bird Bluff, Recess Nunatak and Mount Perkins. Southern features from west to east include Mount Ferranto, Mount Getz, Dermas Bluff, Mount Richardson and Vulcan Nunatak.

== Geology and geography ==
The dominant topography is tall, steep-sided ridges, trending north-south, with peak elevations spanning 1000 to 1200 m. The range consists of the Fosdick Metamorphic Rocks of migmatite gneiss and granite. Metamorphism occurred in the middle of the Cretaceous period. Mount Perkins is a Pleistocene volcano within the range.

== Discovery and name ==
The Fosdick Mountains were discovered by the Byrd Antarctic Expedition (ByrdAE) in 1929, and named by Richard E. Byrd for Raymond B. Fosdick, who became president of the Rockefeller Foundation.

== Western features ==
=== Thompson Ridge ===
76°27′S 146°05′W. A rock ridge, 2 nautical miles (3.7 km; 2.3 mi) long and trending north–south on the south shore of Block Bay, 3.5 nautical miles (6.5 km; 4.0 mi) northwest of Mount Iphigene. The feature was photographed and mapped by the USAS, 1939-41, led by Byrd. The naming was proposed by Admiral Byrd for Gershom J. Thompson, eminent doctor and professor at the Mayo Clinic, who advised on medical questions relating to the Byrd Antarctic Expeditions, 1928-30 and 1933-35, and made financial contributions to them.

=== Mount Luyendyk ===
76.4888889°S 146.0269444°W A summit in the western Fosdick Mountains. It forms a prominent exposure in the northwestern Iphigene massif. The peak is named in recognition of Bruce P. Luyendyk, professor (emeritus), University of California, Santa Barbara, who was active in ground- and ocean-based Antarctic research from 1989 to 2015, significantly advancing the scientific knowledge of the Ross Embayment region of Antarctica. Luyendyk led two on-land expeditions in the Ford Ranges, and was principal investigator for five marine geophysical expeditions in the Ross Sea.

=== Mutel Peak ===
76°31′S 146°03′W. A rock peak 860 metres (2,820 ft) high 2 nautical miles (3.7 km; 2.3 mi) southwest of Mount Iphigene. Photographed and roughly plotted by the ByrdAE, 1928-30, and USAS, 1939-41. Mapped by USGS from surveys and United States Navy air photos, 1959-65. Named by US-ACAN for Robert L. Mutel, ionospheric physicist at Byrd Station, 1969.

=== Mount Iphigene ===
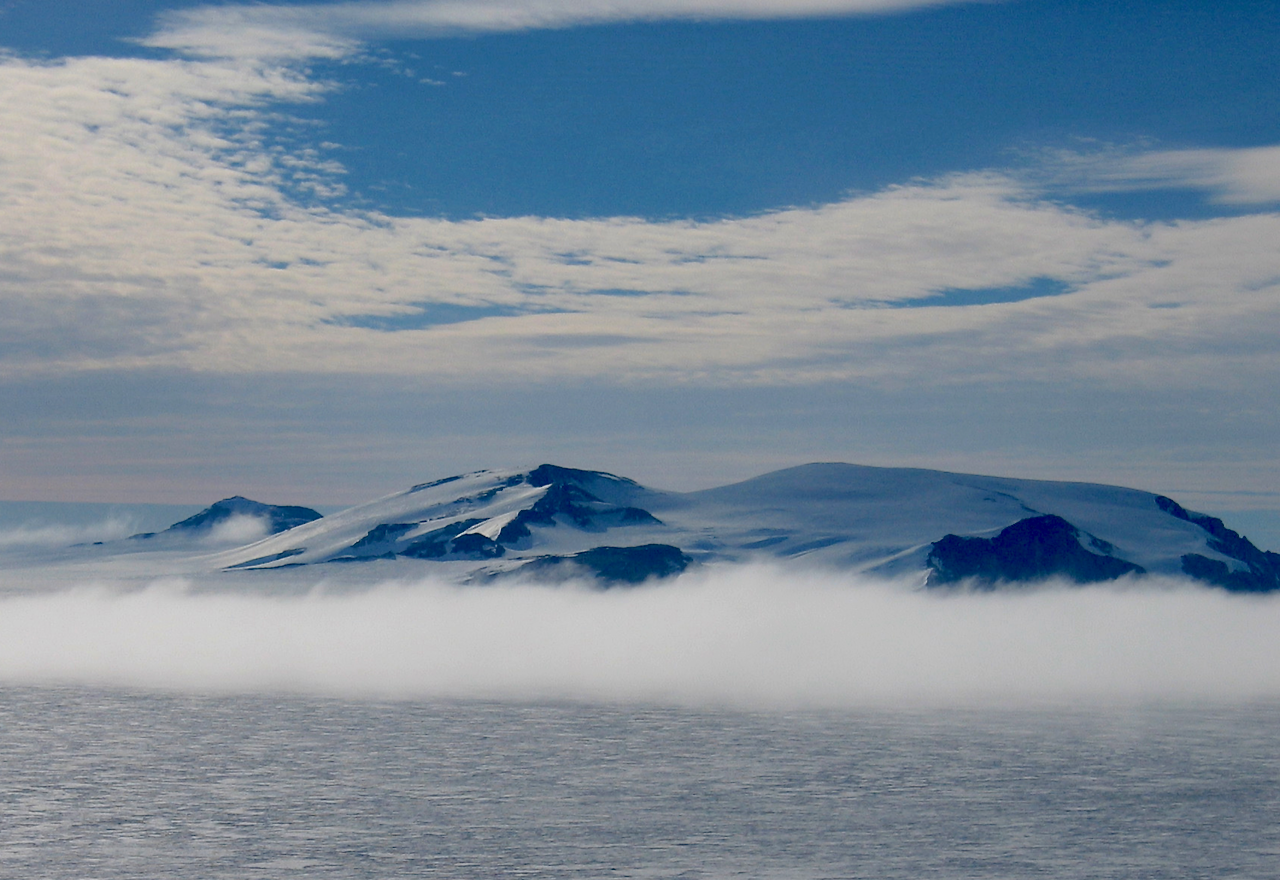
Mount Iphigene, Fosdick Mountains

76°31′S 145°50′W. Mountain just west of Ochs Glacier between Marujupu Peak and Birchall Peaks. Discovered in 1929 by the ByrdAE. Named by Byrd for Iphigene Ochs Sulzberger, daughter of Adolph Ochs and wife of Arthur Hays Sulzberger, patrons of the expedition.

=== Marujupu Peak ===
76°31′S 145°37′W. Conspicuous nunatak standing above the main flow of Ochs Glacier, between Mount Iphigene and Mount Ferranto. Discovered and so named by Rear Admiral Byrd on the ByrdAE flight of 5 December 1929. Marujupu combines the letters from the names of three daughters and a son of Mr. and Mrs. Arthur Hays Sulzberger. The daughters are Marian, Ruth and Judy; Punch is the nickname of son Arthur. The Sulzbergers were patrons of the expedition.

== Northern features ==
=== Mount Avers ===
76°29′S 145°21′W. A mountain 2 nautical miles (3.7 km; 2.3 mi) north of Mount Ferranto. Discovered in December 1929 by the ByrdAE and named for Henry G. Avers, chief mathematician of the Division of Geodesy, United States Coast and Geodetic Survey. He was a member of the National Geographic Society Commission of Experts which determined that Commander (later Rear Admiral) Richard E. Byrd reached the North Pole by airplane (1926) and the South Pole (1929).

=== Mount Lockhart ===
76°28′S 145°06′W. A prominent northerly projection from the main massif of the Fosdick Mountains 4 nautical miles (7.4 km; 4.6 mi) northeast of Mount Avers. Discovered by the ByrdAE on a flight on 5 December 1929. Named for Ernest E. Lockhart, physiologist at West Base of the USAS and a member of the biological party which visited this area in 1940.

=== Mount Bitgood ===
76°29′S 144°55′W. A mountain 1,150 metres (3,770 ft) high between Mount Lockhart and Mount Colombo on the north side of the Fosdick Mountains. Mapped by the United States Antarctic Service (USAS) (1939–41) and by the United States Geological Survey (USGS) from surveys and United States Navy air photos (1959-65). Named by the United States Advisory Committee on Antarctic Names (US-ACAN) for Charles D. Bitgood, geologist with the USARP party to the Fosdick Mountains, 1967-68.

=== Mount Colombo ===
76°31′S 144°44′W. A mountainous projection in the northeast part of the main massif of the Fosdick Mountains, standing 3 nautical miles (5.6 km; 3.5 mi) north of Mount Richardson. Discovered by the ByrdAE on the Eastern Flight of 5 December 1929. Named for Louis P. Colombo, a member of the biological party of the USAS which visited this area in December 1940.

=== Bird Bluff ===
76°30′S 144°36′W. A rock bluff on the north side of the Fosdick Mountains, 2.5 nautical miles (4.6 km; 2.9 mi) east of Mount Colombo. Mapped by USAS (1939-41) and by USGS from surveys and United States Navy air photos (1959-65). Named by US-ACAN for Commander Charles F. Bird, Meteorological Officer on the Staff of the United States Naval Support Force, Antarctica, 1968.

=== Recess Nunatak ===
76°31′S 144°17′W. A small but conspicuous nunatak 1 nautical mile (1.9 km; 1.2 mi) west of Mount Perkins. Mapped by the USAS (1939-41). Later mapped by USGS from surveys and United States Navy air photos (1959-65). So named by US-ACAN because the nunatak is recessed in the ice at the base due to windscooping.

=== Mount Perkins ===
76°32′S 144°08′W. A mountain at the east end of the Fosdick Mountains. Discovered by the ByrdAE on the Northeastern Flight of 15-16 December 1934. Named for Jack E. Perkins, biologist at the USAS West Base (1939-41) and the leader of a biological party which visited this area in December 1940.

== Southern features ==
=== Mount Ferranto ===
76°32′S 145°25′W. A mountain which forms the extreme southwest projection of the main massif of the Fosdick Mountains. Discovered by a sledging party of the ByrdAE which visited this area in November-December 1934. Named for Felix Ferranto, radio and tractor operator with the USAS (1939-41).

=== Mount Getz ===
76°33′S 145°13′W. A mountain 1,120 metres (3,670 ft) high in the south part of the Fosdick Mountains, 5 nautical miles (9.3 km; 5.8 mi) east-southeast of Mount Ferranto. Mapped by USAS (1939-41) led by R. Admiral R.L. Byrd. Named for George F. Getz, Jr., who, like his father, gave financial support toward the exploration efforts of Admiral Byrd.

=== Dermas Bluff ===
76°34′S 144°50′W. A rock bluff on the south side of the Fosdick Mountains, 2 nautical miles (3.7 km; 2.3 mi) west of Mount Richardson. Mapped by USAS (1939-41) under Rear Admiral Richard E. Byrd. Named for Doctor Charles J. Demas who provided medical assistance and supplies for the ByrdAE (1933-35) and USAS (1939–41).

=== Mount Richardson ===
76°34′S 144°39′W. A peak just west of Reece Pass and 3 nautical miles (5.6 km; 3.5 mi) south of Mount Colombo in the southeast part of the Fosdick Mountains. Discovered on aerial flights from West Base of the USAS (1939-41). Named for Harrison H. Richardson, meteorological observer with the biological party which visited this area in 1940.

=== Reece Pass ===
76°32′S 144°32′W. A north-south pass just east of Mounts Colombo and Richardson, in the east part of the Fosdick Mountains. Discovered on aerial flights made from West Base of the USAS (1939-41) and visited by a biological party in 1940. Named for J.A. Reece, radio operator at West Base.

=== Vulcan Nunatak ===
76°35′S 144°37′W. A nunatak, badly sculptured away by ice, the remnant of a huge cone of an extinct volcano, located 2 nautical miles (3.7 km; 2.3 mi) southeast of Mount Richardson. Discovered on 28 November 1934 by Paul Siple and Stevenson Corey of the ByrdAE, 1933-35, who investigated the feature and referred to it as "The Volcano." A form of the original field name has been approved by US-ACAN.

== Sources ==
- Alberts, Fred G., ed. (1995), Geographic Names of the Antarctic (PDF) (2 ed.), United States Board on Geographic Names This article incorporates public domain material from websites or documents of the United States Board on Geographic Names.
- Guest Peninsula, USGS: United States Geological Survey
- Luyendyk, B. P.; Richard, S. M.; Smith, C. H.; Kimbrough, D. L. (1992), "Geological and geophysical investigations in the northern Ford Ranges, Marie Byrd Land, West Antarctica", in Y. Yoshida; K. Kaminuma; K. Shiraishi (eds.), Recent Progress in Antarctic Earth Science: Proceedings of the 6th Symposium on Antarctic Earth Science, Saitama, Japan, 1991, Tokyo, Japan.: Terra Pub., pp. 279–288
- Richard, S. M.; Smith, C. H.; Kimbrough, D. L.; Fitzgerald, P. G.; Luyendyk, B. P.; McWilliams, M. O. (1994), "Cooling history of the northern Ford Ranges, Marie Byrd Land, West Antarctica", Tectonics, 13 (4): 837–857, Bibcode:1994Tecto..13..837R, doi:10.1029/93tc03322, ISSN 0278-7407
- Siddoway, C.; Richard, S.; Fanning, C. M.; Luyendyk, B. P. (2004), "16. Origin and emplacement mechanisms for a middle Cretaceous gneiss dome, Fosdick Mountains, West Antarctica", in D. L. Whitney; C. T. Teyssier; C. Siddoway (eds.), Gneiss domes in orogeny (Special Paper 380), Geological Society of America, pp. 267–294
- Wade, F. A.; Cathey, C. A.; Oldham, J. B. (1977), Reconnaissance geologic map of the Guest Peninsula quadrangle, Marie Byrd Land, Antarctica, Map A-7, Reston, VA.: U. S. Antarctic Research Program
