= Hull Bay =

Bay in Antarctica

- Location within Antarctica
- Location: Marie Byrd Land, Antarctica
- Coordinates: 74°55′S 137°40′W
- Ocean/sea sources: Pacific Ocean

Hull Bay (74°55′S 137°40′W) is an ice-filled bay, about 25 nautical miles (46 km; 29 mi) wide, fed by Hull Glacier, which descends into it between Lynch Point and Cape Burks, on the coast of Marie Byrd Land, Antarctica.

== Discovery and name ==
Hull Bay was discovered by the United States Antarctic Service (USAS), 1939–41. The bay derives its name from Hull Glacier, which was named for Cordell Hull, the United States Secretary of State.

== Location ==
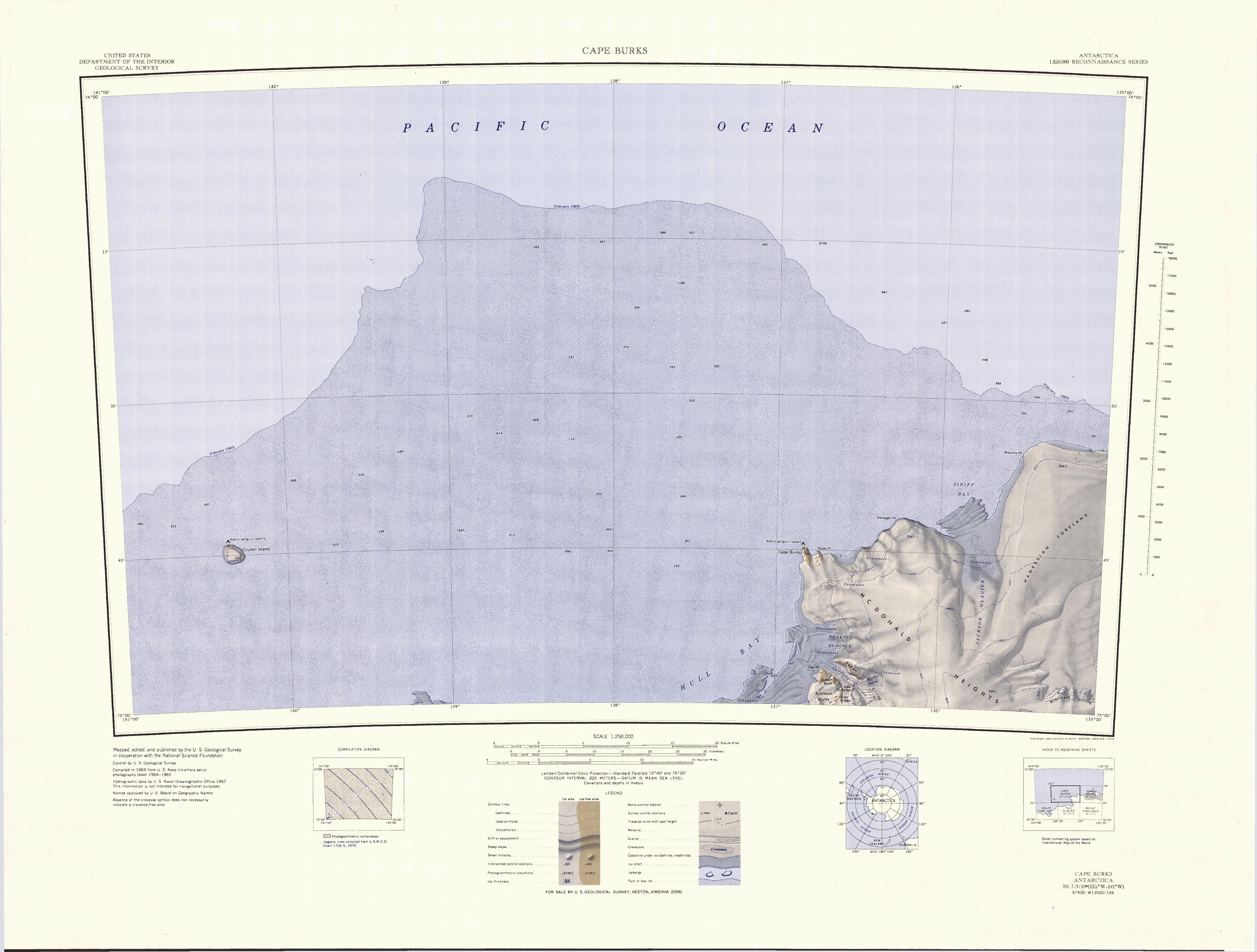
Hull Bay south of map, east of center

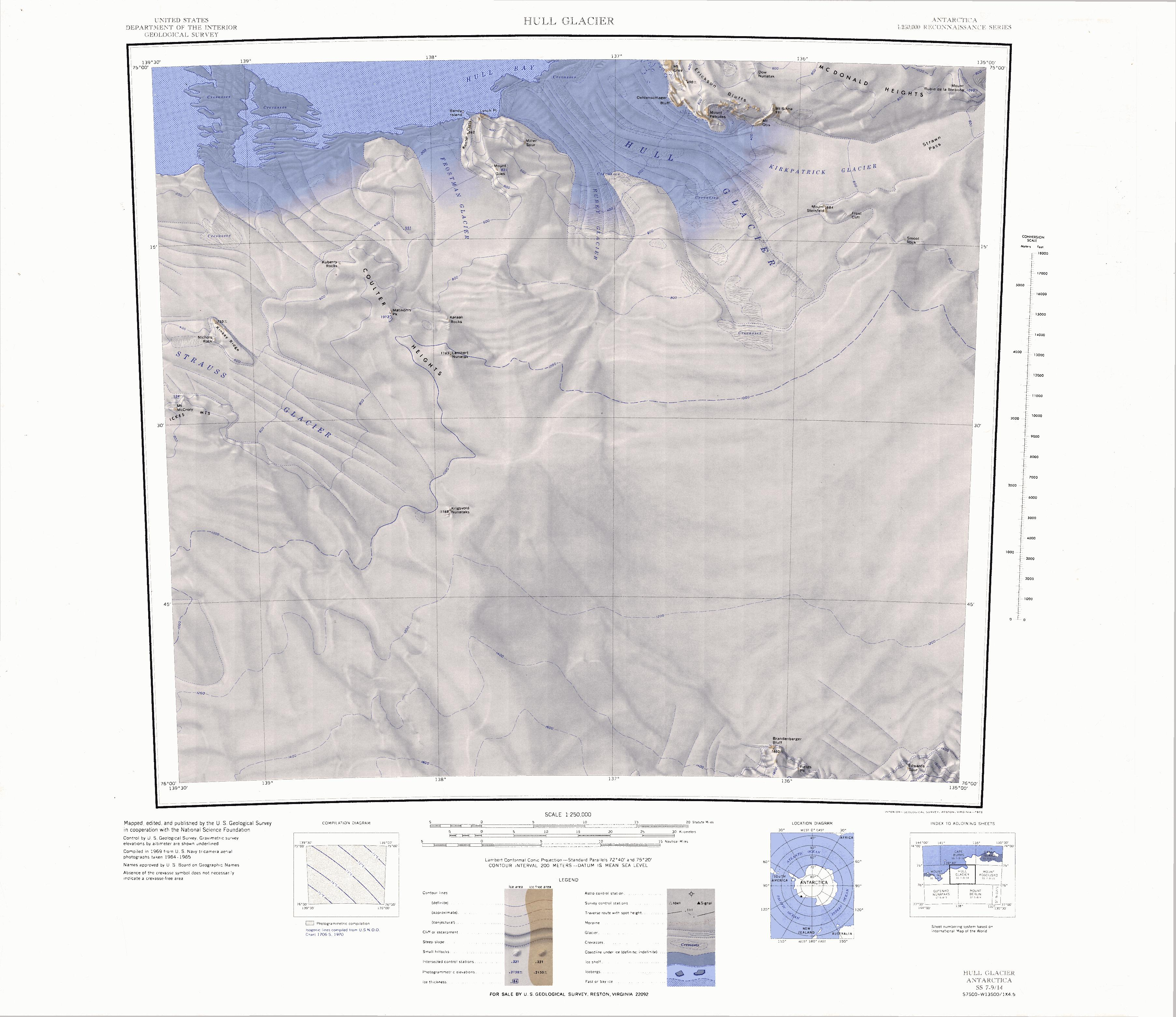
Hull Glacier north of map, east of center

Hull Bay lies on the Southern Ocean coast of Marie Byrd Land, and extends from Frostman Glacier to the west and Cape Burks to the east, at the western end of McDonald Heights. Hull Glacier flows in a northwest direction into the bay between Lynch Point and Mount Grey in the Erickson Bluffs. In the northeast of the bay, Garfield Glacier enters the bay between Cox Point, the Erickson Bluffs and Dee Nunatak to the southwest, and the Rhodes Icefall and Peden Cliffs to the northeast. Perkins Glacier enters the bay to the north of Peden Cliffs.

== Features ==
=== Frostman Glacier ===
75°08′S 137°57′W. A broad, low gradient glacier discharging into the south side of Hull Bay just west of Kontor Cliffs. Mapped by the United States Geological Survey (USGS) from surveys and United States Navy air photos, 1959-65. Named by the United States Advisory Committee on Antarctic Names (US-ACAN) for Thomas O. Frostman, meteorologist at Plateau Station, 1968.

=== Bandy Island ===
75°04′S 137°49′W. A small ice-covered island lying in Hull Bay, 1.5 nautical miles (2.8 km; 1.7 mi) west of Lynch Point. Mapped by USGS from surveys and United States Navy aerial photographs, 1962-67. Named by US-ACAN after Orville L. Bandy (1917-73), professor of geology at the University of Southern California, and a participant since 1961 in several USARP projects. In 1964 and 1966, respectively, he was chief scientist on cruises 7 and 17 of RV Anton Bruun, and took part in several cruises of USNS ltanin. The island was named in Jan 1975 by a board decision.

=== Lynch Point ===
75°05′S 137°44′W. A rocky point at the seaward end of the peninsula between Frostman Glacier and Hull Glacier. Photographed from US AS (1939-41) aircraft on December 18, 1940. Mapped by USGS from surveys and United States Navy air photos, 1959-65. Named by US-ACAN for Ens. William R. Lynch II, United States Navy Reserve, Damage Control Officer aboard USS Glacier in exploring these coastal waters, 1961 -62.

=== Cape Burks ===
74°45′S 136°50′W. A prominent rock cape, the northwest seaward extension of McDonald Heights, marking the east side of the entrance of Hull Bay. The cape was sighted and mapped from the USS Glacier, January 31, 1962. It was named for Lieutenant Commander Ernest Burks, United States Navy, senior helicopter pilot on the Glacier and first person to set foot on the cape.

=== Garfield Glacier ===
74°57′S 136°35′W. A glacier, 6 nautical miles (11 km; 6.9 mi) long, flowing between Peden Cliffs and Cox Point to the east side of Hull Bay. Mapped by USGS from surveys and United States Navy air photos, 1959-65. Named by US-ACAN for Donald E. Garfield, who participated in deep core drilling activities at Byrd Station, 1967-68.

=== Cox Point ===
74°56′S 136°43′W. A rock point at the southwest side of the terminus of Garfield Glacier where the latter discharges into Hull Bay. The point was first observed and photographed from aircraft of the US AS, 1939–41, led by Admiral Richard Byrd. Named by US-ACAN for E.F. Cox, carpenter of ByrdAE, 1933-35.

=== Dee Nunatak ===
74°58′S 136°31′W. (Note: Alberts (1995) gives the location of Dee Nunatak as 74°28′S 136°31′W, far north of Garfield Glacier. This appears to be a typo. A more plausible location is 74°58′S 136°31′W.) A rock nunatak which appears to be within the flow of Garfield Glacier, in the west part of McDonald Heights.The feature lies 1 nautical mile (1.9 km; 1.2 mi) west of Rhodes Icefall. Mapped by USGS from surveys and United States Navy air photos, 1959-65. Named by US-ACAN for Lieutenant Thomas H. Dee, United States Navy, Medical Officer at Byrd Station, 1970.

=== Rhodes Icefall ===
74°58′S 136°25′W. An icefall draining west out of McDonald Heights through a breach in the middle of Peden Cliffs. The icefall nourishes the Garfield Glacier near the coast of Marie Byrd Land. Mapped by USGS from surveys and United States Navy air photos, 1959-65. Named by US-ACAN for William L. Rhodes, ABH1, United States Navy, Aviation Boatswain's Mate, crash crew leader at Williams Field, McMurdo Sound, during Operation Deep Freeze 1968, 1969 and 1970.

=== Peden Cliffs ===
74°57′S 136°28′W. A line of cliffs, 6 nautical miles (11 km; 6.9 mi) long, breached near the center by Rhodes Icefall. The cliffs border the north side of Garfield Glacier in the west part of McDonald Heights, Marie Byrd Land. Mapped by USGS from surveys and United States Navy air photos, 1959-65. Named by US-ACAN for Irene C. Peden, ionospheric physicist who made investigations on electrical measurements of the ice sheet near Byrd Station, 1970-71.

=== Perkins Glacier ===
74°54′S 136°37′W. A broad, low gradient glacier 8 nautical miles (15 km; 9.2 mi) south-southeast of Cape Burks. It drains west from McDonald Heights into the east side of Hull Bay. Mapped by USGS from surveys and United States Navy air photos, 1959-65. Named by US-ACAN for Earle B. Perkins, biologist with the ByrdAE, 1933-35.

== Sources ==
- Alberts, Fred G., ed. (1995), Geographic Names of the Antarctic (PDF) (2 ed.), United States Board on Geographic Names This article incorporates public domain material from websites or documents of the United States Board on Geographic Names.
- Cape Burks, USGS: United States Geological Survey
- Hull Glacier, USGS: United States Geological Survey
- This article incorporates public domain material from websites or documents of the United States Geological Survey.
