= Marie Byrd Land =

Unclaimed West Antarctic region

- Region
- Area map of Marie Byrd Land
- Etymology: Wife of explorer Richard E. Byrd
- Interactive map of Marie Byrd Land
- Coordinates: 80°S 120°W
- Continent: Antarctica

Area
  - Total: 1,610,000 km^{2} (620,000 sq mi)

Marie Byrd Land (MBL) is an unclaimed region of Antarctica. With an area of 1,610,000 km^{2} (620,000 sq mi), it is the largest unclaimed territory on Earth. It was named after the wife of American naval officer Richard E. Byrd, who explored the region in the early 20th century.

The territory lies in West Antarctica, east of the Ross Ice Shelf and the Ross Sea and south of the Pacific Ocean portion of the Antarctic or Southern Ocean, extending eastward approximately to a line between the head of the Ross Ice Shelf and Eights Coast. It stretches between 158°W and 103°24'W. The inclusion of the area between the Rockefeller Plateau and Eights Coast is based upon Byrd's exploration.

== Overview ==
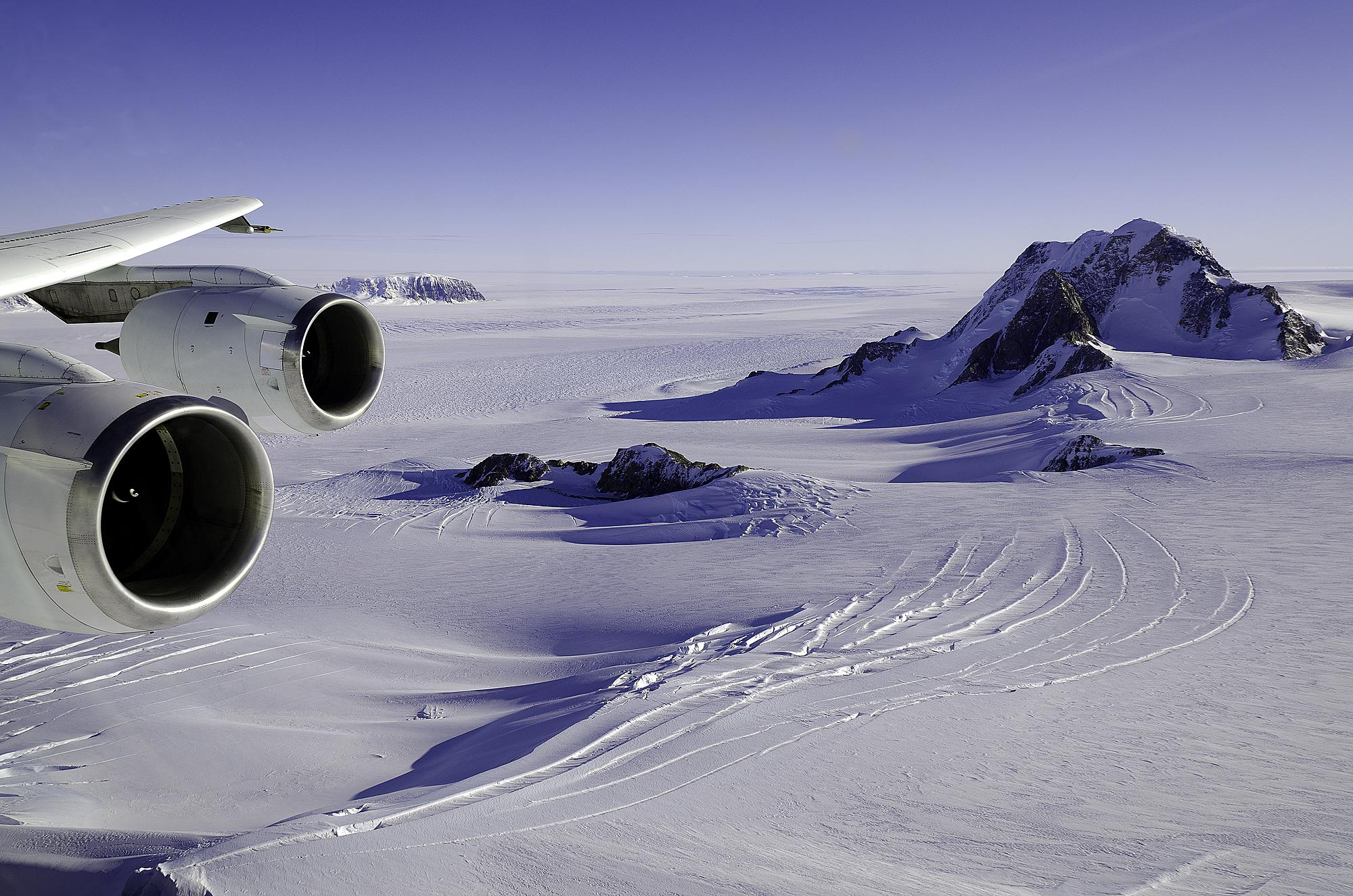
Glaciers and rock outcrops in Marie Byrd Land seen from NASA's DC-8 aircraft on October 17, 2011

Because of its remoteness, even by Antarctic standards, most of Marie Byrd Land (the portion east of 150°W) has not been claimed by any sovereign state. It is by far the largest single unclaimed territory on Earth, with an area of 1,610,000 km^{2} (620,000 sq mi), including Eights Coast, immediately east of Marie Byrd Land. In 1939, United States President Franklin D. Roosevelt instructed members of the United States Antarctic Service Expedition to take steps to claim some of Antarctica as United States territory. Although this appears to have been done by members of this and subsequent expeditions, these do not appear to have been formalized prior to 1959, when the Antarctic Treaty System was set up. Some publications in the United States have shown this as a United States territory in the intervening period, and the United States Department of Defense has stated that the United States has a solid basis for a claim in Antarctica resulting from its activities prior to 1959. The portion west of 150°W is part of Ross Dependency, which is claimed by New Zealand.

Five coastal areas are distinguished, which are listed from west to east:

No.	Sector	Western border	Eastern border
1	Saunders Coast	158°00'W	146°31'W
2	Ruppert Coast	146°31'W	136°50'W
3	Hobbs Coast	136°50'W	127°35'W
4	Bakutis Coast	127°35'W	114°12'W
5	Walgreen Coast	114°12'W	103°24'W
	Marie Byrd Land	158°00'W	103°24'W

== Exploration ==
Marie Byrd Land was first explored from the west where it could be accessed from the Ross Sea. The far western coast of Marie Byrd Land was seen from the decks of Robert Falcon Scott's ship Discovery in 1902. He named the peninsula adjacent to the Ross Sea King Edward VII Land and the scattered outcrops that were within sight, the Alexandra Mountains. In 1911, during Roald Amundsen's South Pole expedition, Kristian Prestrud led a sledge party that visited these isolated outcrops (nunataks) in the region bordering the eastern Ross Sea and Ross Ice Shelf. At the same time the first Japanese Antarctic Expedition led by Nobu Shirase landed a shore party on the peninsula.

Dean Smith was the pilot during aerial overflights in 1929 with Richard E. Byrd's first Antarctic expedition (1928–1930). It originated from Little America near Amundsen's original base camp Framheim in the Bay of Whales, led to the discovery of the Rockefeller Mountains and the Edsel Ford Ranges farther to the east. Byrd named the region after his wife Marie. A geological party led by L. Gould briefly explored parts of the Rockefeller Mountains.

The first deep overland exploration occurred during the second Byrd expedition (1933–1935) when a sledge party led by Paul Siple and Franklin Alton Wade reached as far east as the Fosdick Mountains in 1934. Aerial exploration discovered lands farther east along the Ruppert Coast.

The Third Byrd Antarctic Expedition, also called the United States Antarctic Service Expedition, took place from 1939 to 1941. This expedition established two base camps 2,600 kilometres (1,600 miles) apart. West Base was near the former Little America base (68° 29' S, 163° 57' W) and East Base was near the Antarctic Peninsula on Stonington Island (68° 12' S, 67° 3' W). Exploration flights out of these two bases led to the discovery of most of the Marie Byrd Land Volcanic Province (e.g. Executive Committee Range) and much of the coastal region including the Walgreen, Hobbs, and Ruppert Coasts. During the expedition trail parties from West Base visited the northern Ford Ranges and south slopes of the Fosdick Mountains.

The United States Navy mounted several expeditions to Antarctica in the period 1946 to 1959. These expeditions (Operation Highjump led by R. E. Byrd, Windmill, and Deep Freeze I–IV) included aerial photography using the Trimetrogon system of aerial photographs (TMA; vertical, left, and right oblique images over the same point) over portions of coastal Marie Byrd Land.

The U.S. Navy began construction of Byrd Station at 80°S, 120°W with traverses out of Little America V in 1956–57 during Deep Freeze II. These efforts were in advance of the International Geophysical Year (IGY; from July 1957 to end of 1958) that saw several exploratory overland traverses with tractor trains (Sno-cats and modified bulldozers). Starting in January 1957 (pre-IGY) Charles R. Bentley led a traverse from Little America V to the new Byrd station along the route blazed by United States Army engineers a few months before (the Army-Navy Drive). His team conducted measurements of ice thickness and of the Earth's magnetic and gravity field. The following summer season (1957–58) he led a second traverse out of Byrd Station that visited volcanoes of the Marie Byrd Land Volcanic Province for the first time. The traverse reached the Sentinel Mountains beyond eastern Marie Byrd Land before returning to Byrd Station. Bentley led a third traverse out of Byrd Station to the Horlick Mountains in 1958–59. These three traverses led to the discovery of the Bentley Subglacial Trench or Trough, a deep bedrock chasm between MBL and the Transantarctic Mountains of East Antarctica.

During 1958–1960 TMA flights and a traverse out of Byrd Station visited and mapped the Executive Committee Range. TMA were flown in western Marie Byrd Land in 1964 and 1965. Following these efforts the United States Geological Survey (USGS) mounted land surveys to establish a series of reference points and benchmarks throughout much of Marie Byrd Land during 1966–1968.

USS Glacier (AGB-4) explored the parts of the Walgreen Coast and Eights Coast in 1960–61. It had parties of geologists and surveyors along that were deployed to outcrops on land. This expedition to the far eastern reaches of Marie Byrd Land determined that Thurston Peninsula as proposed by earlier expeditions was in fact an island (Thurston Island). In the same season a geological party led by Campbell Craddock explored the Jones Mountains in the adjacent region.

The United States Byrd Coastal Survey during 1966–1969, led by F. A. Wade, conducted geologic mapping of the Alexandra and Rockefeller Mountains and the Ford Ranges and produced a series of 1:250,000 geologic maps of the region. This was a complex expedition involving remote helicopter camps and airborne geophysics.

Several geological expeditions explored Marie Byrd Land during the period 1978–1993. New Zealand geologists surveyed the Ford Ranges and Edward VII Peninsula in two expeditions, 1978–79 and 1987–88. Exploration of the Marie Byrd Land Volcanic Province began in earnest by U.S. geologists in 1984–85. The WAVE project (West Antarctic Volcano Exploration) focused on the volcanic province during the period 1989–1991. The SPRITE project (South Pacific Rim International Tectonic Expedition) explored regions and surroundings of the Hobbs Coast in 1990–1993. Members of both projects were from the U.S., Britain, and New Zealand. During the Austral summers of 1989–1990 and 1990–1991, a geological party from the University of California, Santa Barbara (UCSB) explored several of the mountain ranges within the northern Ford Ranges of Marie Byrd Land (FORCE expedition; Ford Ranges Crustal Exploration). GANOVEX VII a multinational expedition led by Germany visited Edward VII Peninsula in 1992–93.

Colorado College geologists led expeditions to the Ford Ranges in 1998–2001 (Ford Ranges), 2005–2007 and 2011–2013 (Fosdick Mountains).

== Research camps and stations ==
Marie Byrd Land hosted the Operation Deep Freeze base Byrd Station (NBY; originally at 80°S, 120°W, rebuilt at 80°S, 119°W), beginning in 1957, in the hinterland of Bakutis Coast. Byrd Station was the only major base in the interior of West Antarctica for many years. In 1968, the first ice core to fully penetrate the Antarctic Ice Sheet was drilled here. The year-round station was abandoned in 1972, and after operating for years as a temporary summer encampment, Byrd Surface Camp, Byrd Station was reopened by the United States Antarctic Program (USAP) in 2009–2010 to support operations in northern West Antarctica.

On Ruppert Coast of Marie Byrd Land is the Russian station Russkaya, which was occupied 1980–1990 and is now closed.

East of the Siple Coast off the Ross Ice Shelf, Siple Dome was established as a summer science camp in 1996. Ice cores have been drilled here to retrieve the climate history of the last 100,000 years. This camp also served as a base for airborne geophysical surveys supported by the University of Texas Institute for Geophysics (UTIG).

In 1998–1999, a camp was operated at the Ford Ranges (FRD) in western Marie Byrd Land, supporting a part of a United States Antarctic Program (USAP) airborne survey initiated by UCSB and supported by the UTIG flying out of Siple Dome.

In 2004–05, a large camp, Thwaites (THW) was established by the USAP 150 km (93 mi) north of NBY, in order to support a large airborne geophysical survey of eastern Marie Byrd Land by the UTIG.

In 2006, a major encampment, WAIS Divide (WSD) was established on the divide between the Ross Sea Embayment and the Amundsen Sea Embayment, in the easternmost portion of Marie Byrd Land, in order to drill a high resolution ice core. Drilling and coring ended in 2014.

In 2018, the International Thwaites Glacier Collaboration commenced with a large and ongoing physical presence onshore of the Amundsen Sea. It entails marine, airborne, and on-ice geophysical exploration that will illuminate the character of Marie Byrd Land bedrock geology and the nature of the eastern boundary of the province. The goal is determining the stability of the glacier and prediction of global sea level rise from shrinking of the WAIS.

== Geography and geology ==
Adjacent to the continent, Marie Byrd Land is bordered by the Amundsen Sea in the east and the Ross Sea and Ross Ice Shelf in the west. Mountain ranges are prominent along and near the coastline with a few exceptions. Marie Byrd Land is covered by the vast West Antarctic Ice Sheet (WAIS). The WAIS in Marie Byrd Land drains off the continent to the east into the Ross Ice Shelf via seven ice streams. Along the coast of the Southern Ocean and the Amundsen Sea, ice drains via glaciers, the major one being the Thwaites. West Antarctica and Marie Byrd Land have elevations of up to 1.5 to 2 kilometers on the surface of the WAIS. In contrast, East Antarctica has interior elevations on its ice sheet of over 4 kilometers.

The West Antarctic Rift System (WARS) that evolved over the last hundred million years, includes all or part of Marie Byrd Land. The WARS extends from the Ross Sea continental shelf east into Marie Byrd Land. The ice streams and glaciers that drain the WAIS have been proposed to follow rift valleys, now buried by ice, which formed in the WARS. The WARS contains a volcanic province with volcanoes active from the Eocene epoch to a few thousand years ago.

A mantle plume was discovered deep below Marie Byrd Land. Heat from the plume has been proposed responsible for uplift of a significant portion of West Antarctica to form the Marie Byrd Land Dome.

A digital map of Antarctica includes the geology of Marie Byrd Land. The geologic history of Marie Byrd Land in West Antarctica was summarized in a 2020 publication.

=== Glaciers, ice streams, and ice shelves ===
Prominent glaciers that drain the WAIS in MBL include the Thwaites, and also the Pine Island Glacier, both of which empty into the Amundsen Sea. Of the seven ice streams that drain into the Ross Ice Shelf, the Bindschadler and Whillans ice streams are the most extensive. The seven ice streams discharge 40 percent of the WAIS. Besides the Ross Ice Shelf, significant ice shelves on the coast of the Southern Ocean include the Sulzberger, and Nickerson.

=== Mountain ranges, peaks, summits, and sub-ice topography ===
Due to the burial of the continental basement of MBL by the WAIS, mountain ranges are exposed towards the coast of MBL where ice thickness is smaller. Prominent ranges include the Ford Ranges in western MBL, The Flood Range, the Executive Committee Range, and the Kohler Range. The Ford Ranges are the most extensive and include more than six individual named mountain groups. The Executive Committee Range includes five volcanoes, some proposed to be dormant or active. The Flood Range comprises a linear chain of Neogene and Quaternary age volcanoes. The Fosdick mountains in the northern Ford Ranges are a 30-kilometer-long span of Cretaceous metamorphic rocks. Most other exposed rock in MBL is Paleozoic metamorphosed sedimentary rock and granitoid, and Mesozoic granitoid.

Away from the coasts, the WAIS buries individual mountains and ranges that are not named, the exception being major features such as the Bentley Subglacial Trench.

Marie Byrd Seamount (70°0′S 118°0′W) is a seamount named in association with Marie Byrd Land; name approved June 1988 (Advisory Committee on Undersea Features, 228).

==== Mountain peaks and summits ====
Not comprehensive.

- Alexandra Mountains
- Rockefeller Mountains
- Haines Mountains
- Sarnoff Mountains
  - The Billboard
  - Mount Stagnaro
- Denfeld Mountains
- Fosdick Mountains
  - Mount Iphigene
  - Mount Luyendyk
- Phillips Mountains
  - Mount Carbone
  - Mount June
  - Mount Paige
- Mount Peddie
- Mount Petrides
- Mount Rubin de la Borbolla
- Flood Range
- Executive Committee Range
  - Mount Sidley
  - Mount Waesche
