= List of glaciers of Marie Byrd Land =

Area map of Marie Byrd Land

Following is a list of glaciers of Marie Byrd Land in Antarctica. This list may not reflect recently named glaciers in Marie Byrd Land.

- Arthur Davis Glacier
- Arthur Glacier
- Balchen Glacier
- Beakley Glacier
- Berry Glacier
- Boschert Glacier
- Boyd Glacier
- Brush Glacier
- Bunner Glacier
- Clausen Glacier
- Coleman Glacier
- Colorado Glacier
- Crevasse Valley Glacier
- Davisville Glacier
- Dorchuck Glacier
- El-Sayed Glacier
- Fahnestock Glacier
- Farbo Glacier
- Frostman Glacier
- Gardiner Glacier
- Garfield Glacier
- Griffith Glacier
- Hammond Glacier
- Haynes Glacier
- Holcomb Glacier
- Holt Glacier
- Horrall Glacier
- Howe Glacier
- Hueneme Glacier
- Hulbe Glacier
- Hull Glacier
- Jacobel Glacier
- Jacoby Glacier
- Johns Glacier
- Johnson Glacier
- Kansas Glacier
- Keys Glacier
- Kirkpatrick Glacier
- Klein Glacier
- Kohler Glacier
- Land Glacier
- Leverett Glacier
- Lord Glacier
- McCarthy Glacier
- McClinton Glacier
- Nereson Glacier
- Norfolk Glacier
- Ochs Glacier
- Olentangy Glacier
- Parks Glacier
- Paschal Glacier
- Perkins Glacier
- Pope Glacier
- Quonset Glacier
- Ragle Glacier
- Reedy Glacier
- Reynolds Glacier
- Robison Glacier
- Roos Glacier
- Rosenberg Glacier
- Rubey Glacier
- Scambos Glacier
- Shuman Glacier
- Siemiatkowski Glacier
- Simmons Glacier
- Singer Glacier
- Sorenson Glacier
- Steuri Glacier
- Strauss Glacier
- Swope Glacier
- Thurston Glacier
- Thwaites Glacier
- True Glacier
- Van Reeth Glacier
- Vane Glacier
- Venzke Glacier
- Vornberger Glacier
- Warpasgiljo Glacier
- White Glacier
- Wotkyns Glacier
- Zuniga Glacier
