= Mount Gilmour =

Mountain in Marie Byrd Land, Antarctica

Mount Gilmour (76°56′S 144°40′W) is a mountain 4 nautical miles (7 km) southeast of Mount Passel on the central part of the irregular ridge separating Crevasse Valley Glacier and Arthur Davis Glacier (ex-Warpasgiljo Glacier), in the Edsel Ford Ranges of Marie Byrd Land, Antarctica.

== West Base Geological Party Expedition ==
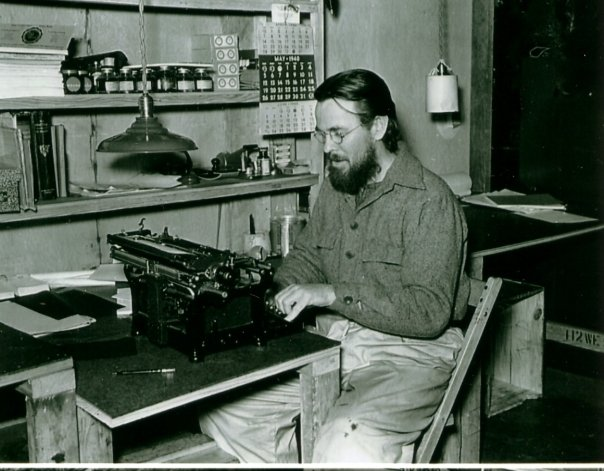
Harold P. Gilmour. He is seen here at his "desk" at the West Base (Little America III) in May, 1940.

Discovered in 1940 by the four Geological Party Expedition members of the West Base, Little America III of the United States Antarctic Service (USAS). Named for Harold P. Gilmour, one of the four Geological Party Expedition members, recorder, and subsequently historian and administrative assistant to the expedition commander, Rear Admiral Richard E. Byrd.

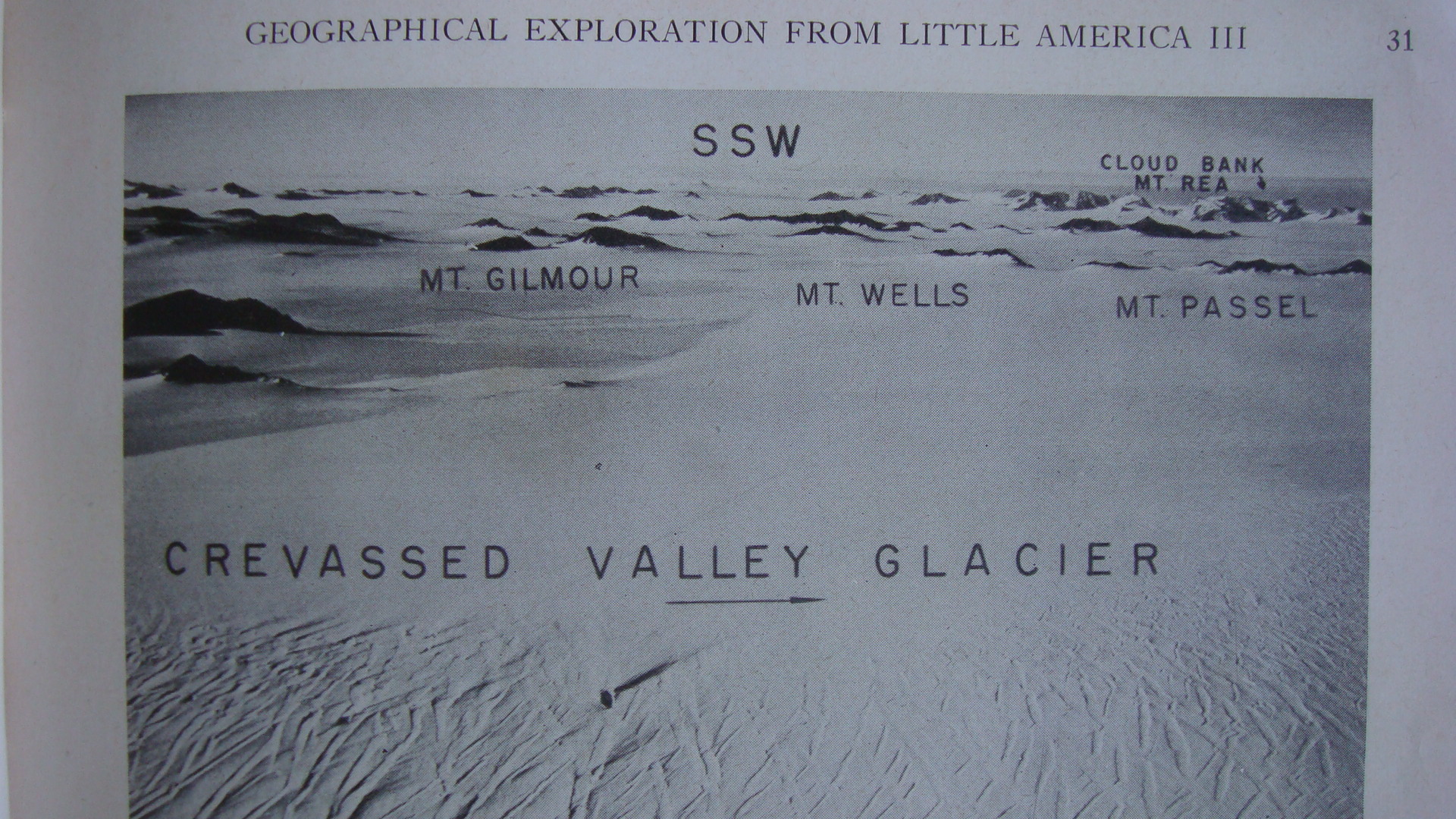
Mount Gilmour as seen from an aerial view photograph on p31 of Proceedings, American Philosophical Society (vol. 89, 1945)

In February 1940, shortly after West Base was set up in Little America III, Dr. Paul Siple directed an airplane flight from the West Base to the Edsel Ford Ranges to determine where exploration and geological work was to be done during the next summer season, and numerous aerial photographs were taken. During the long winter months that followed, fairly accurate maps were made of the Southern Edsel Ford Ranges. This is an area of approximately 7,000 square miles (18,000 km^{2}) of mountainous coastland in the northwestern region of Marie Byrd Land. During the 1940 winter night, a Geological Party Expedition of four explorers was organized and they prepared for the extremely long trek on two dog sleds to the Edsel Ford Ranges. The four-man party was composed of Lawrence A. Warner, leader and geologist, Charles F. Passel, geologist and radio operator, Harold P. Gilmour "Gil", recorder and collector of biological specimens and Loran Wells "Joe", photographer and observer. The extensive Warpasgiljo Glacier was discovered and named for these four members (WARner + PASsel + GILmour + JOe) of the Geological Party Expedition.

The Geological Party's Expedition objective was to map and geologically survey as much of the southern portion of the Edsel Ford Range as possible, and additionally investigate the natural resources of the area and triangulate accurately for improved maps of the region. The four-man Geological Party Expedition left the West Base on October 17, 1940 to explore and record the territory and returned 82 days later on January 7, 1941 traveling a total of 691 nautical miles (1,280 km) on board their dog sleds. In the nearly three-month expedition, they had to be supported by airplanes that deposited supplies at 100-mile (160 km) intervals along their charted route. The Geological Party Expedition visited for the first time some 50 peaks in this region and some 300 geological specimens were collected. Mount Gilmour was one of those peaks.

== Expedition Dog Sleds used in the 1939-1941 Byrd Polar Expedition ==
During the 1939-1941 Expedition, dog sleds were the most reliable form of ground exploration in Antarctica. A dog sled team capable of transporting two men contained nine dogs. They could haul around 100 lb (45 kg) per dog, for a total of 900 lb (410 kg). For a 30-day expedition, some 550 lb (250 kg) of food were needed for the two men and the dogs. The other 350 lb (160 kg) were used for fuel and camping equipment. With good weather in the Antarctic summer, they could travel 10 knots (19 km/h) per day, or a total of 300 knots (560 km/h).

== See also ==
- Wells Ridge
