= Harry Gilmore =

Harry Gilmore may refer to:

- Harry Gilmor (1838–1883), Confederate cavalry officer and the Baltimore City Police Commissioner
- Harry J. Gilmore (1937–2015), American diplomat

== See also ==
- Harold P. Gilmour (1903–1969), volunteer Antarctic explorer
- Harry Gilmer (1926–2016), American football halfback and quarterback
