= Ickes Mountains =

Mountain range in Marie Byrd Land, Antarctica

- Location within Antarctica

Geography
- Range coordinates: 75°29′S 139°45′W

The Ickes Mountains (/ˈɪkəs/, ICK-əs) (75°29′S 139°45′W) are a series of coastal mountains that extend west from Strauss Glacier for 15 nautical miles (28 km; 17 mi) in Marie Byrd Land, Antarctica.

== Discovery and name ==
The Ickes Mountains were discovered from aircraft of the United States Antarctic Service on 18 December 1940. The name Ickes Mountains, after United States Secretary of the Interior Harold L. Ickes, appeared in the maps and reports resulting from this expedition although Ickes objected and never acquiesced to the use. Nonetheless, the name became established in usage and in 1966 was approved by the United States Advisory Committee on Antarctic Names (US-ACAN). The United States Antarctic Service was established in the Division of Territories and Island Possessions of the United States Department of the Interior in 1939, during the period (1933–46) that Ickes was secretary.

== Location ==
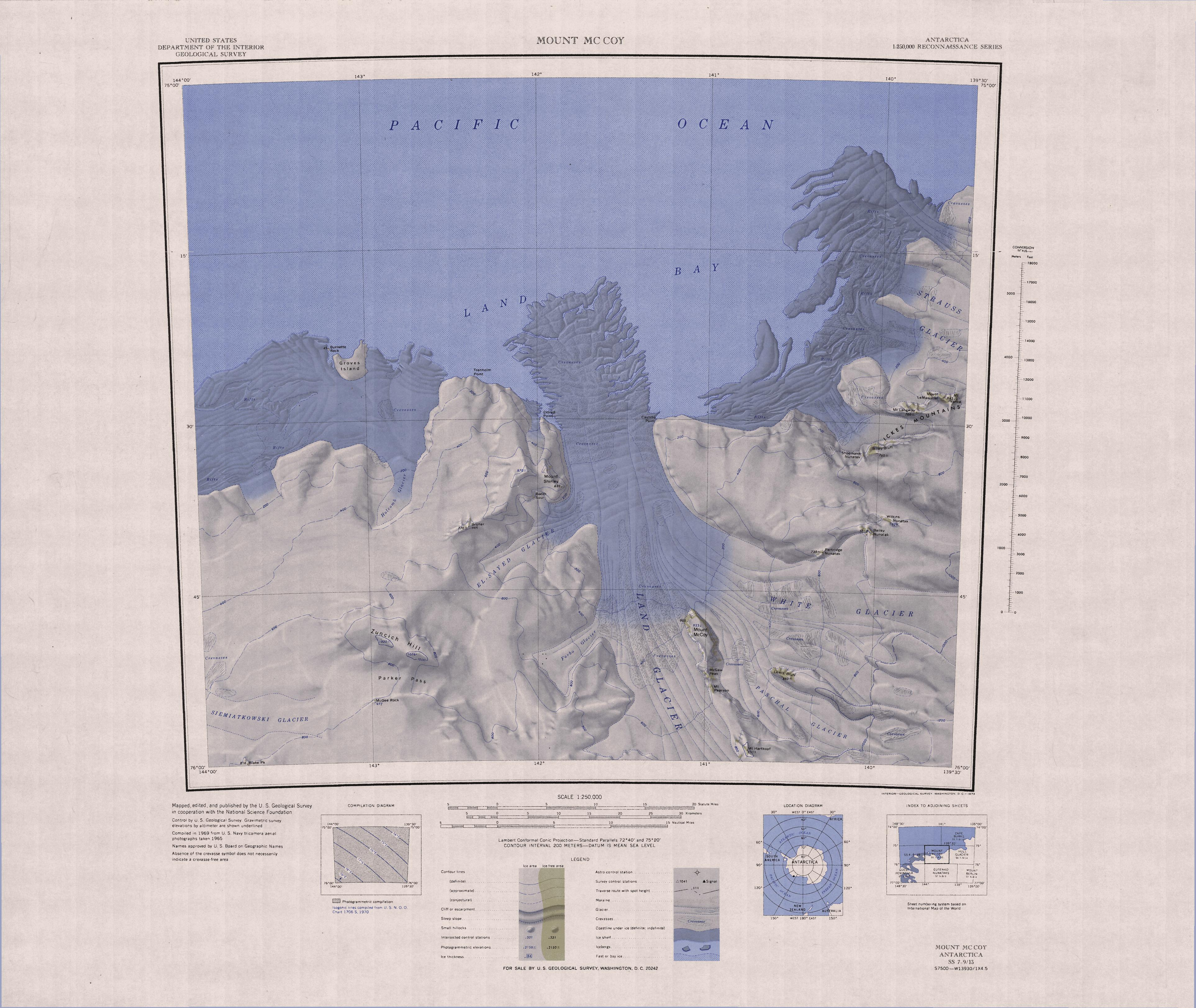
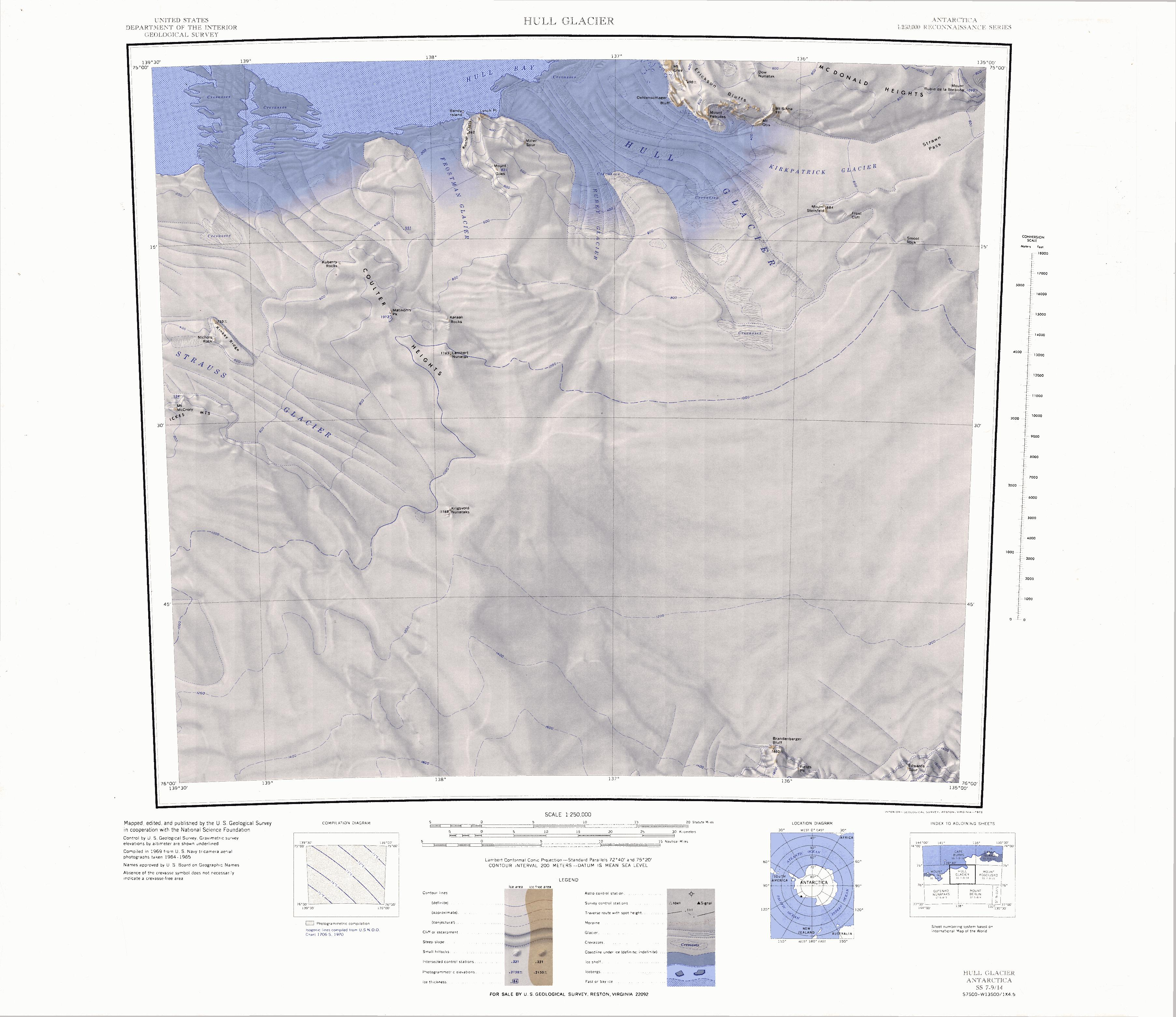
Ickes Mountains in north east of left map, northwest of right map

The Ickes Mountains are south of the mouth of Strauss Glacier in Land Bay on the Pacific Ocean. They are east of the mouth of Land Glacier. Features include, from west to east, Shoemake Nunatak, Billey Bluff, Mount Langway, Mount LeMasurier, Mount Vance and Mount McCrory. Nearby features to the south include Partridge Nunatak, Bailey Nunatak and Wilkins Nunatak.

== Features ==
=== Shoemake Nunatak ===
75°33′S 140°05′W. A nunatak immediately west of Billey Bluff at the southwest end of the Ickes Mountains. The nunatak was photographed from aircraft of the US AS, 1939-41, and was mapped by the United States Geological Survey (USGS) from surveys and United States Navy aerial photography, 1959-65. Named by US-ACAN for John L. Shoemake, aerographer, United States Navy, weather observer at Brockton Station on the Ross Ice Shelf during two summer seasons, 1968-69 and 1969-70.

=== Billey Bluff ===
75°32′S 140°02′W. A rocky coastal bluff 4 nautical miles (7.4 km; 4.6 mi) southwest of Mount Langway in the west part of Ickes Mountains. Mapped by USGS from surveys and United States Navy air photos, 1959-65. Named by US-ACAN for John P. Billey, ionospheric physicist, Scientific Leader at Byrd Station, 1971.

=== Mount Langway ===
75°29′S 139°47′W. A coastal mountain 760 metres (2,490 ft) high located 2.5 nautical miles (4.6 km; 2.9 mi) southwest of Mount LeMasurier . The mountain was first photographed from aircraft of the USAS, 1939-41. Named by US-ACAN for Chester C. Langway, USARP glaciologist at Byrd Station, 1968-69.

=== Mount LeMasurier ===
75°27′S 139°39′W. An ice-free coastal mountain which rises to more than 800 metres (2,600 ft) high between Mount Vance and Mount Langway, in the central part of the Ickes Mountains. The feature was discovered and photographed from aircraft of the USAS, 1939-41. Named by US-ACAN for Wesley E. LeMasurier, geologist with Marie Byrd Land Survey II, 1967-68.

=== Mount Vance ===
75°28′S 139°34′W. A mountain 840 metres (2,760 ft) high rising between Mount LeMasurier and Mount McCrory. Mapped by USGS from surveys and United States Navy air photos, 1959-65. Named by US-ACAN for Dale L. Vance, ionospheric scientist at Byrd Station, 1963, and United States Exchange Scientist to the Vostok station, 1971.

=== Mount McCrory ===
75°29′S 139°26′W. A mountain 2 nautical miles (3.7 km; 2.3 mi) east-southeast of Mount Vance in the east part of the Ickes Mountains. Mapped by USGS from surveys and United States Navy air photos, 1959-65. Named by US-ACAN for Captain Eugene E. McCrory, USCG, Commanding Officer of USCGC Glacier, during Operation Deep Freeze 1969 and 1970.

== Nearby features ==
=== Partridge Nunatak ===
75°42′S 140°20′W. The westernmost of three aligned nunataks lying southward of the Ickes Mountains. The nunatak, 730 metres (2,400 ft) high, is located along the north side of White Glacier, about 5 nautical miles (9.3 km; 5.8 mi) west of Bailey Nunatak. Mapped by USGS from surveys and United States Navy air photos, 1959-65. Named by US-ACAN for Billy W. Partridge, EOC, United States Navy, Chief Equipment Operator at Byrd Station, 1966.

=== Bailey Nunatak ===
75°40′S 140°02′W. A nunatak, 1,010 metres (3,310 ft) high, located along the north flank of White Glacier, midway between Partridge Nunatak and Wilkins Nunatak. Mapped from United States Navy air photos and USGS surveys, 1959-65. Named by US-ACAN for Andrew M. Bailey, meteorologist at Byrd Station, 1963.

=== Wilkins Nunatak ===
75°39′S 139°55′W. The northeasternmost of three nunataks. It lies 6 nautical miles (11 km; 6.9 mi) southwest of Ickes Mountains. Mapped by USGS from surveys and United States Navy air photos, 1959-65. Named by US-ACAN for Melvin L. Wilkins, QMS, United States Navy, Quartermaster aboard USS Glacier in exploration of this coast, 1961-62.

== Sources ==
- Alberts, Fred G., ed. (1995), Geographic Names of the Antarctic (PDF) (2 ed.), United States Board on Geographic Names This article incorporates public domain material from websites or documents of the United States Board on Geographic Names.
- Hull Glacier, USGS: United States Geological Survey
- Mount McCoy, USGS: United States Geological Survey
- This article incorporates public domain material from websites or documents of the United States Geological Survey.
