= Fahnestock =

Fahnestock may refer to:

- Clarence Fahnestock State Park, a park in Putnam and Dutchess counties, New York, US
- Fahnestock clip, an early type of spring clamp electrical terminal for connections to bare wires
- Fahnestock Glacier, a glacier in Antarctica
- Harris C. Fahnestock (1835–1914), American investment banker
