= Arthur C. Davis =

United States Navy admiral (1893–1965)

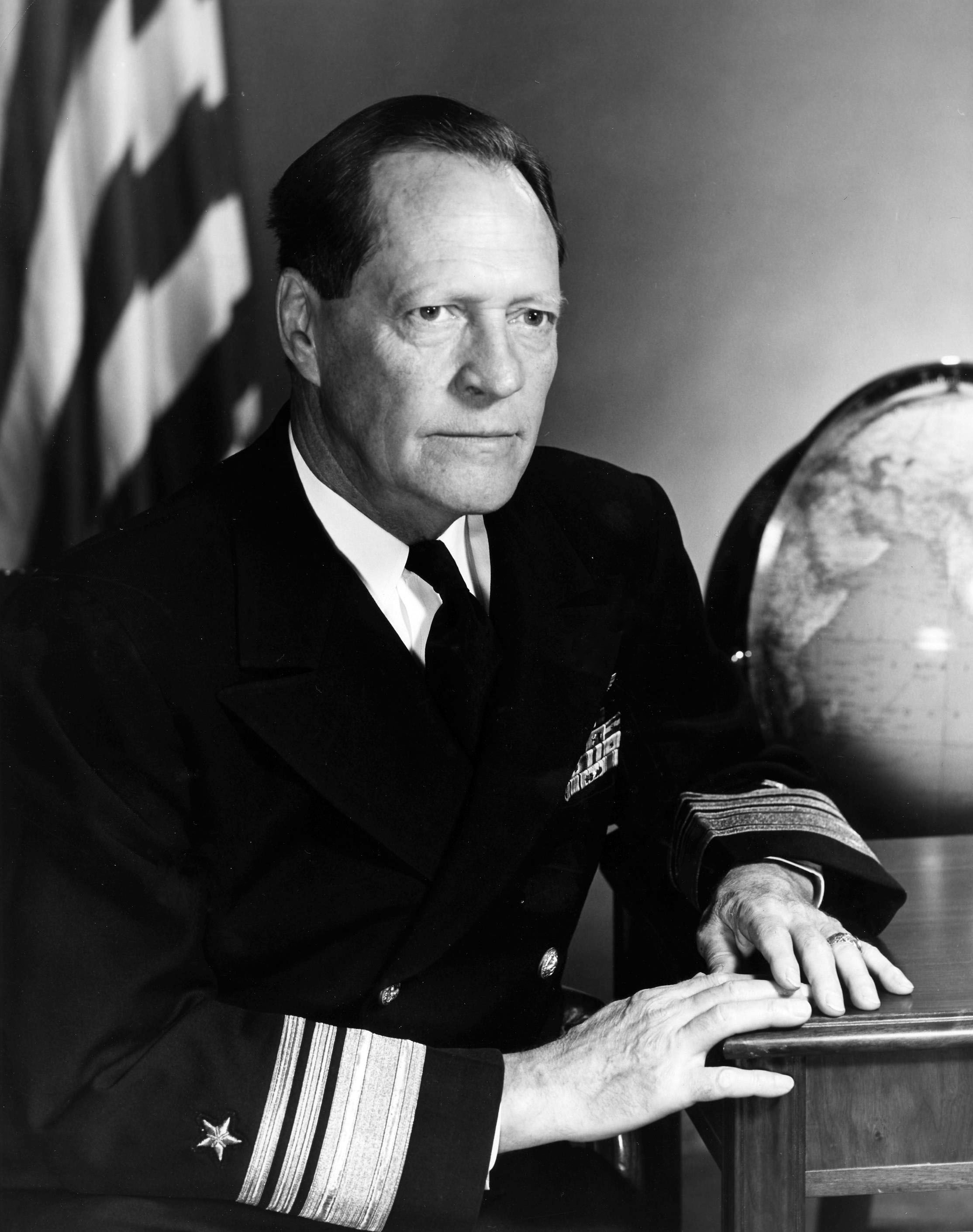
- Born: 14 March 1893; Columbia, South Carolina, U.S.
- Died: 10 February 1965 (aged 71)
- Burial place: Arlington National Cemetery, Arlington, Virginia
- Military career
- Allegiance: United States of America
- Branch: United States Navy
- Service years: 1915–1955
- Rank: Admiral
- Nickname: "Art"
- Commands: USS Ranger Air Group; USS Langley; USS Enterprise; Carrier Replacement Squadron U.S. Atlantic Fleet; Fleet Air Atlantic; Carrier Division Five
- Conflicts: World War I; World War II; Pacific War; Guadalcanal campaign; Battle of the Eastern Solomons; Battle of the Atlantic; Battle of Iwo Jima; Battle of Okinawa; Cold War
- Awards: Navy Cross; Distinguished Service Medal with Gold Star; Legion of Merit with Gold Star and Oak Leaf Cluster; Presidential Unit Citation

Arthur Cayley Davis (14 March 1893 – 10 February 1965) was an admiral of the United States Navy. His career included service in World War II and the Cold War. He was a pioneer of dive bombing.

== Naval career ==
Davis was born on 14 March 1893 in Columbia, South Carolina. He attended the University of Nebraska from 1909 to 1911, before his appointment to the United States Naval Academy in 1911. He was commissioned an ensign upon graduation in 1915.

After various early assignments, Davis reported to Naval Air Station Pensacola in Pensacola, Florida, for flight training. He was designated a naval aviator in 1923. Duties at the U.S. Navy's Bureau of Aeronautics and Bureau of Ordnance soon followed. While there, Davis became a pioneer of dive bombing; he developed dive bombing techniques and in 1925, he designed a bombsight for use in dive bombing.

By 1934, Davis, a lieutenant commander, became commander of the air group aboard the aircraft carrier USS Ranger. He was head of the Plans Division of the Bureau of Aeronautics from 1936 to 1939, then served as the commanding officer of the seaplane tender USS Langley from 1939 to 1940. Under his command, USS Langley operated in the United States Atlantic Fleet from February to July 1939. It was then deployed to Manila in the Philippines for service in the United States Asiatic Fleet.

=== World War II ===
In mid-1940, by-then-Captain Davis became the aviation officer on the staff of the Commander-in-Chief, Pacific Fleet, the position he held when the Japanese attacked Pearl Harbor, Hawaii, on 7 December 1941. This incident brought the United States into World War II. He continued in this position until 30 June 1942. For his next tour, he was named as the commanding officer of the aircraft carrier USS Yorktown. However, the ship was sunk on 7 June 1942 in the late stages of the Battle of Midway before he could report aboard. As a result, he instead took command of the aircraft carrier USS Enterprise on 30 June 1942.

Davis led Enterprise into combat in the Guadalcanal campaign, supported United States Marine Corps amphibious landings on Guadalcanal in the Solomon Islands and fought in the Battle of the Eastern Solomons on 24 August 1942. During the battle, USS Enterprise suffered more damage than any other American ship involved, when Japanese dive bombers scored three hits and four near misses on her, killing 77 and wounding 91 of her crew and seriously damaging her. After his promotion to rear admiral, Davis received the Navy Cross for his actions aboard USS Enterprise on 24 August, the citation for the award read, "By his remarkable seamanship, resourcefulness and his outstanding skill in maneuvering his ship, Rear Admiral Davis met the vigorous Japanese dive-bombing attack coolly and courageously, holding the damage by bomb hits to the Enterprise to a minimum and, in turn, inflicting heavy casualties on the attacking enemy planes."

After relinquishing command of USS Enterprise on 21 October 1942 and receiving his promotion to rear admiral, Davis served in the Atlantic Fleet, first as Commander, Carrier Replacement Squadron, Atlantic Fleet in 1942, then as Commander, Fleet Air, Atlantic Fleet, from 1942 to 1943, and finally as Assistant Chief of Staff, Atlantic Fleet, from 1943 to 1944.

In September 1944, Admiral Raymond A. Spruance, the Commander of United States Fifth Fleet, chose Davis as his chief of staff after Admiral Ernest King, the Chief of Naval Operations, ordered that all commanders with a surface warfare background have a chief of staff with aviation experience and vice versa. Davis won over Spruance with his competence and congeniality and was described as a "lean, rough, aggressive leader" who "moved decisively and intelligently." Davis was with the Fifth Fleet until July 1945, and during his tour the fleet operated in the Pacific Ocean against Japanese forces in the Iwo Jima and Okinawa campaigns. He then became the commander of Carrier Division Five.

=== Later career ===
After leaving Carrier Division Five, Davis was the Deputy U.S. Military Representative to the North Atlantic Treaty Organization (NATO) Military Staff Committee. He then was Director of the Joint Staff for the Joint Chiefs of Staff from 20 September 1949 to 1 November 1951, before being promoted to vice admiral in 1951. He served as Deputy United States Representative to the Standing Group, North Atlantic Treaty Organization until 16 August 1953. On 1 November 1953, Davis became Deputy Assistant Secretary of Defense for International Security Affairs and the U.S. Navy's Director of Foreign Military Affairs, positions he held until his retirement from active duty in April 1955. He was promoted to the four-star rank of admiral upon retirement.

== Decorations and awards ==
Davis received an award of the Navy Cross, two awards of the Distinguished Service Medal, and three awards of the Legion of Merit. In addition, USS Enterprise was awarded a Presidential Unit Citation for the period 7 December 1941 to 15 November 1942, which included Davis's time in command.

== Personal life ==
Davis was married to Eunice M. Davis (1908–1974).

== Death ==
Davis died on 10 February 1965. He was buried with his wife at Arlington National Cemetery, in Arlington County, Virginia.

== Legacy ==
The U.S. Advisory Committee on Antarctic Names renamed the Warpasgiljo Glacier in Antarctica the Arthur Davis Glacier in honor of Davis.
