= Coulter Heights =

Mountains in Antarctica

- Location within Antarctica

Geography
- Range coordinates: 75°21′S 138°15′W

Coulter Heights (75°21′S 138°15′W) are snow-covered heights that rise between Strauss Glacier and Frostman Glacier near the coast of Marie Byrd Land, Antarctica. The rock outcrops of Kuberry Rocks, Matikonis Peak and Lambert Nunatak protrude above the snow surface of the heights.

== Mapping and name ==
Coulter Heights was mapped by the United States Geological Survey (USGS) from surveys and from United States Navy air photographs in 1959–65. They were named by the United States Advisory Committee on Antarctic Names (US-ACAN) for Neil M. Coulter, a meteorologist at Byrd Station in 1963.

== Location ==
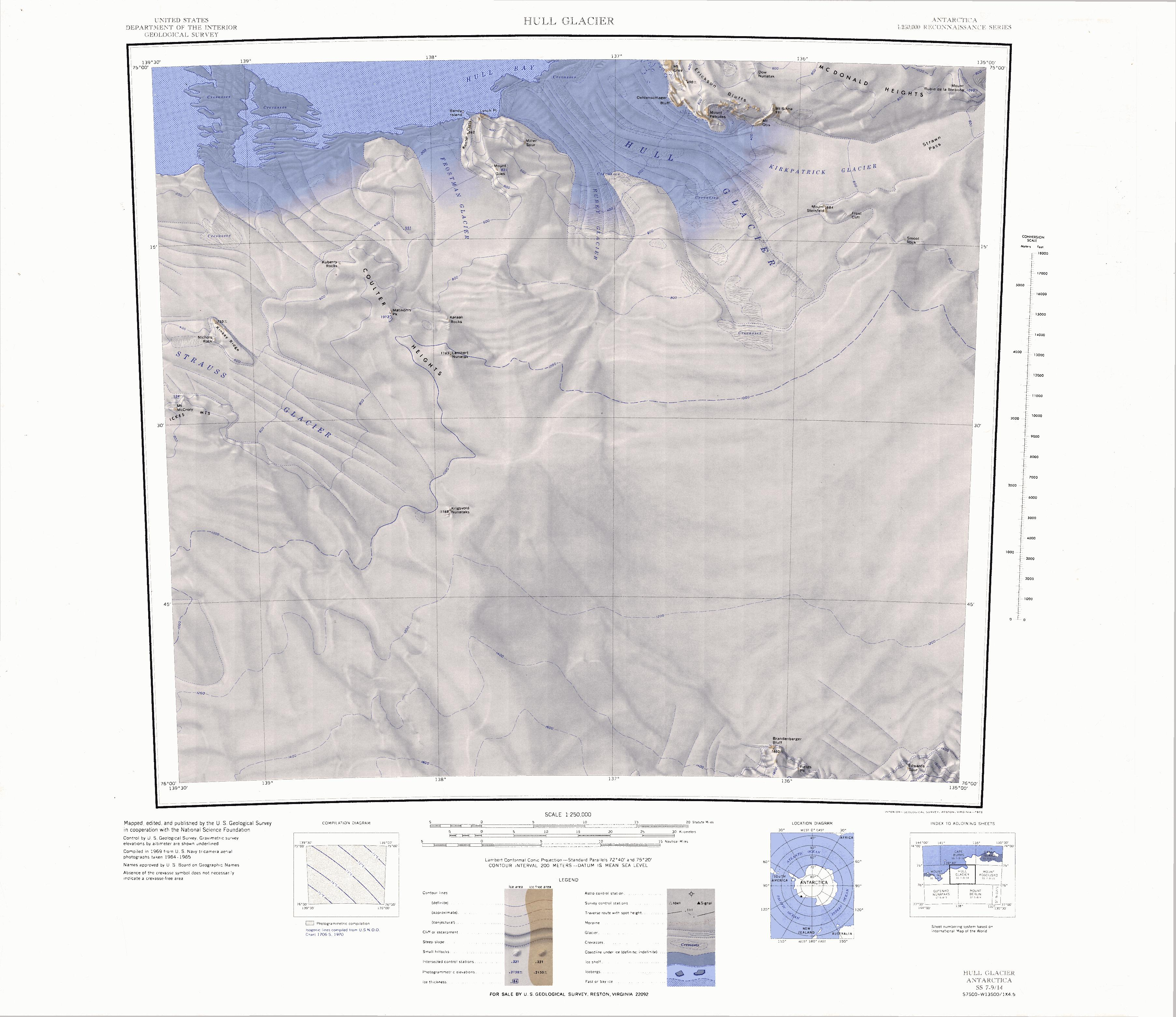
Coulter Heights towards northwest of map

The Coulter Heights are south of the coast of Marie Byrd Land, southwest of Hull Bay, between Strauss Glacier to the west and Frostman Glacier to the east. Features, from north to south, include Kuberry Rocks, Matikonis Peak, Karaali Rocks and Lambert Nunatak.

== Features ==
=== Kuberry Rocks ===
75°17′S 138°31′W. A small area of exposed rock at the north end of Coulter Heights. The rocks are 6 nautical miles (11 km; 6.9 mi) northwest of Matikonis Peak. Mapped by USGS from surveys and United States Navy air photos, 1959-65. Named by US-ACAN for Richard W. Kuberry, geomagnetist/seismologist at Byrd Station, 1969-70.

=== Matikonis Peak ===
75°21′S 138°14′W. A small, rather isolated rock peak that protrudes through the snow mantle of central Coulter Heights. Mapped by USGS from surveys and United States Navy air photos, 1959-65. Named by US-ACAN for William P. Matikonis, DC2, United States Navy, Damage Controlman aboard USS Glacier, 1961-62.

=== Karaali Rocks ===
75°22′S 137°55′W. A small group of rocks along the east side of the mainly snow-covered Coulter Heights. They are located 5 nautical miles (9.3 km; 5.8 mi) east of Matikonis Peak. Mapped by USGS from surveys and United States Navy air photos, 1959-65. Named by US-ACAN for Atok Karaali, ionospheric physicist at Plateau Station, 1968.

=== Lambert Nunatak ===
75°25′S 137°54′W. A rock nunatak that protrudes through the snow mantle of southeastern Coulter Heights. Mapped by USGS from surveys and United States Navy air photos, 1959-65. Named by US-ACAN for Paul A. Lambert, QM1, United States Navy, Senior Quartermaster on the USS Glacier, 1961-62.

=== Clarke Glacier ===
75.1833333°S 139.1°W. A glacier about 8 nautical miles (15 km; 9.2 mi) long draining from Coulter Heights to Hull Bay. Named by US-ACAN after Theodore S. Clarke, geophysicist, University of Wisconsin. His research from early 1990s to the present focused on theoretical and field analysis of ice stream area of West Antarctica.

== Sources ==
- Alberts, Fred G., ed. (1995), Geographic Names of the Antarctic (PDF) (2 ed.), United States Board on Geographic Names This article incorporates public domain material from websites or documents of the United States Board on Geographic Names.
- "Clarke Glacier", Geographic Names Information System, United States Geological Survey, United States Department of the Interior
- Hull Glacier, USGS: United States Geological Survey
- This article incorporates public domain material from websites or documents of the United States Geological Survey.
