= Lewis Bluff =

Lewis Bluff (75°53′S 140°36′W) is a rock bluff located at the confluence of Paschal Glacier and White Glacier, 7 nautical miles (13 km) southeast of Mount McCoy, in coastal Marie Byrd Land. The bluff was photographed from aircraft of the United States Antarctic Service, 1939–41, and was mapped in detail by the United States Geological Survey, 1959–65. It was named by the Advisory Committee on Antarctic Names for David L. Lewis, a United States Antarctic Research Program ionospheric physicist at Byrd Station, 1963.
