= Christina Hulbe =

American Antarctic researcher, educator

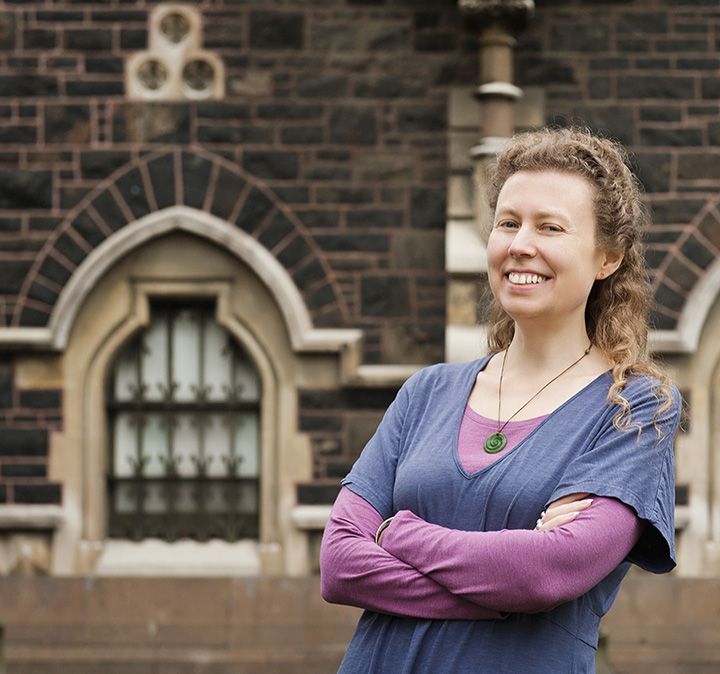
- Education: Montana College of Mineral Science and Technology; Ohio State University (MS); University of Chicago (PhD)
- Scientific career
- Fields: Glaciology
- Workplaces: University of Otago
- Website: Christina Hulbe at the University of Otago

Christina Hulbe is an American Antarctic researcher, and as of 2016 serves as professor and Dean of Surveying at the University of Otago in New Zealand. She was previously Chair of the Geology Department at Portland State University in Portland, Oregon. She leads the NZARI project to drill through the Ross Ice Shelf and is the namesake of the Hulbe glacier.

== Early life and education ==
Hulbe grew up in Sacramento, California, spending a lot of time in the Sierra Nevada and the Warner Mountains to the north. Her father was a geologist and professor (at Sacramento City College and Sacramento State University). She completed a degree in geological engineering from the Montana College of Mineral Science and Technology. She completed her Master of Science in 1994 at Ohio State University followed in 1998 by a geophysics PhD from the University of Chicago.

== Career and impact ==
In 1998 she held a NRC Research Associateship, NASA Goddard Space Flight Center. From there she moved to Portland State University in Portland, Oregon.

Her work in the late 1990s constituted the first melding together of the types of ice-sheet thermomechanical models (simulating ice-stream dynamics embedded within the flow of the inland ice sheet that behaves according to a different set of dynamics). She contributed to the understanding of ice-shelf instability, with some of the first papers that identified surface meltwater as an agent in the break-up of Larsen B ice shelf (in 2002).

She has developed methods used to identify ice-shelf and ice-stream flow variability as observed by the geometry of flow streaks and other indicators, and this is one of the few ways in which the history of glacial flow over the “medium past” (the past between the reach of direct observation and the more distant reach of ice coring).

Hulbe's work in the understanding of Heinrich Events of the North Atlantic was informed by her experience with Antarctic-based ice-shelf and ice-stream instability (and sedimentology), and this has led to a mechanism that is currently popular in understanding Heinrich Events (the idea of deeper waters warming and destabilizing an ice shelf in the Labrador Sea is her idea).

In 2017 Hulbe led an expedition as part of a New Zealand project seeking to drill through the Ross Ice Shelf which was the first mid-shelf penetration since J9 in the late 1970s. One of the key findings was that the ice in the region was re-freezing. This re-freezing and growth of an ice shelf is not uncommon but the Ross Ice Shelf situation appeared to be very variable as there was no evidence of long-term freezing. A recent analysis attributes this variability in-part to tidal mixing.

Hulbe has been heavily involved with the International Glaciological Society (IGS) and oversaw its transition from a mode of service to the community to an open access publishing provider.

In 2025, she was elected Deputy Chair of the Waitaki Whitestone Geopark Trust.

== Awards and honours ==
Hulbe was Vice President (2009 – 2012) of the International Glaciological Society as well as a Fulbright Senior Scholar (New Zealand, 2009). She was awarded the Portland State University College of Liberal Arts and Sciences, John Elliot Allen Outstanding Teaching Award in 2004 and 2007. She also chairs the University of Otago Equity Advisory Committee and has written a history of women in glaciology and has campaigned extensively against armed conflict.

The Hulbe Glacier on the Siple Coast is named after her.

In 2020, Hulbe was awarded the Richardson Medal by the International Glaciological Society along with Eric Wolff. In 2024, the University of Otago appointed Hulbe as a Poutoko Taiea Distinguished Professor, to begin in January 2025.
