= Pope Glacier =

Glacier in Marie Byrd Land, Antarctica

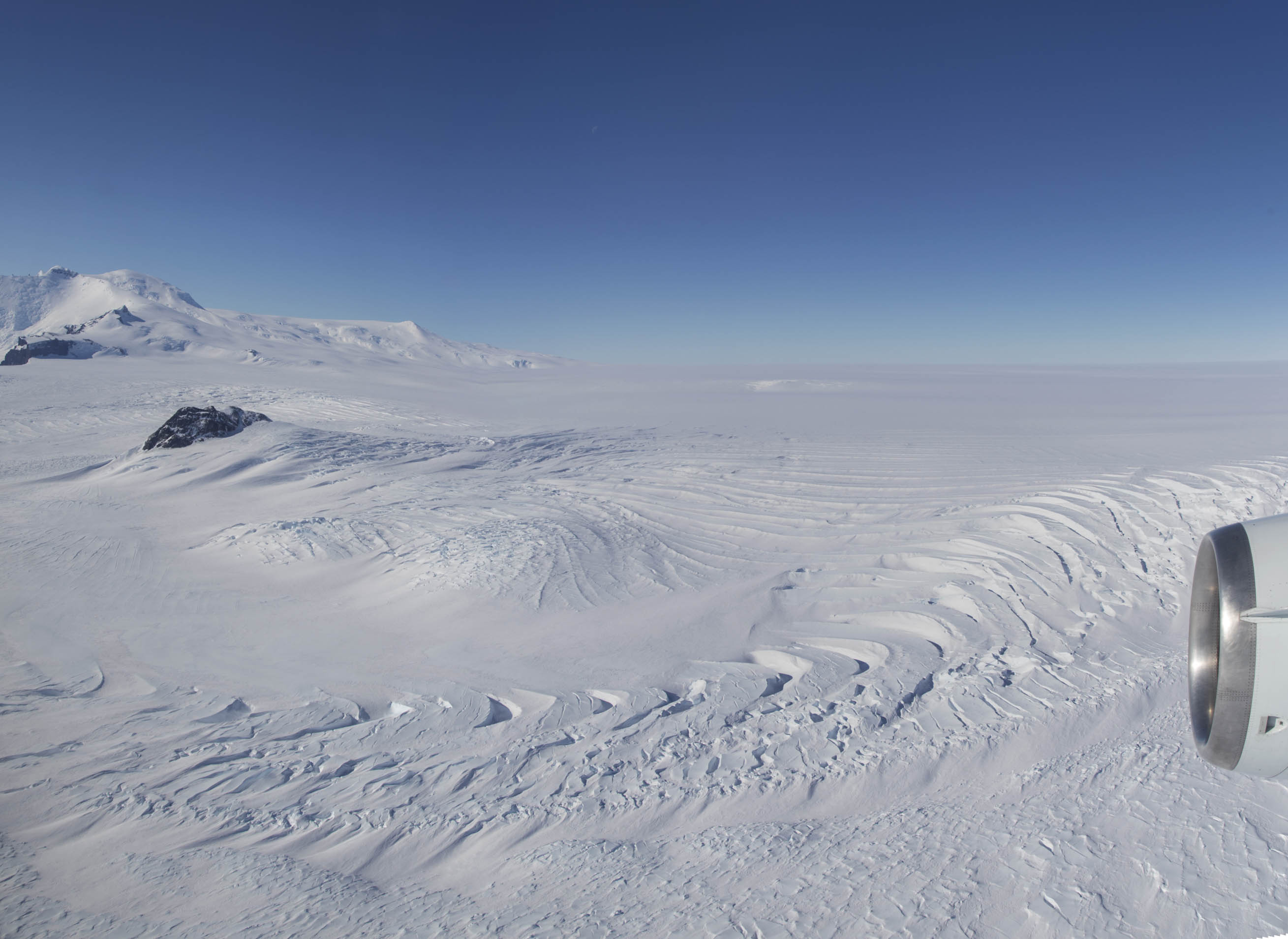
Pope Glacier in November 2016

Pope Glacier (75°19′S 111°22′W) is a glacier about 20 nautical miles (37 km) long, flowing north along the west side of Mount Murphy to Crosson Ice Shelf on Walgreen Coast, in Marie Byrd Land. Mapped by United States Geological Survey (USGS) from surveys and U.S. Navy air photos, 1959–66. Named by Advisory Committee on Antarctic Names (US-ACAN) after Maj. Donald R. Pope, (CE) USA, civil engineer on the staff of the Commander, Naval Support Force, Antarctica, 1965–67. It is a tributary of Smith Glacier.
