= Strauss Glacier =

Glacier in Marie Byrd Land, Antarctica

- Location within Antarctica
- Location: Marie Byrd Land, Antarctica
- Coordinates: 77°20′S 139°40′W

Strauss Glacier (77°20′S 139°40′W) is a glacier, 40 nautical miles (74 km; 46 mi) long, flowing between the Ickes Mountains and Coulter Heights to enter the sea at the east side of Land Bay, Marie Byrd Land, Antarctica.

== Mapping and name ==
The Strauss Glacier was mapped by the United States Geological Survey (USGS) from surveys and United States Navy air photographs between 1959 and 1965. The naming was proposed to United States Advisory Committee on Antarctic Names (US-ACAN) by Admiral Richard E. Byrd. It was named for Lewis Strauss, Chairman of the United States Atomic Energy Commission, 1953–58, longtime friend and advisor to Admiral Byrd who recommended that the Antarctic be used to demonstrate peaceful employment of atomic energy.

== Location ==
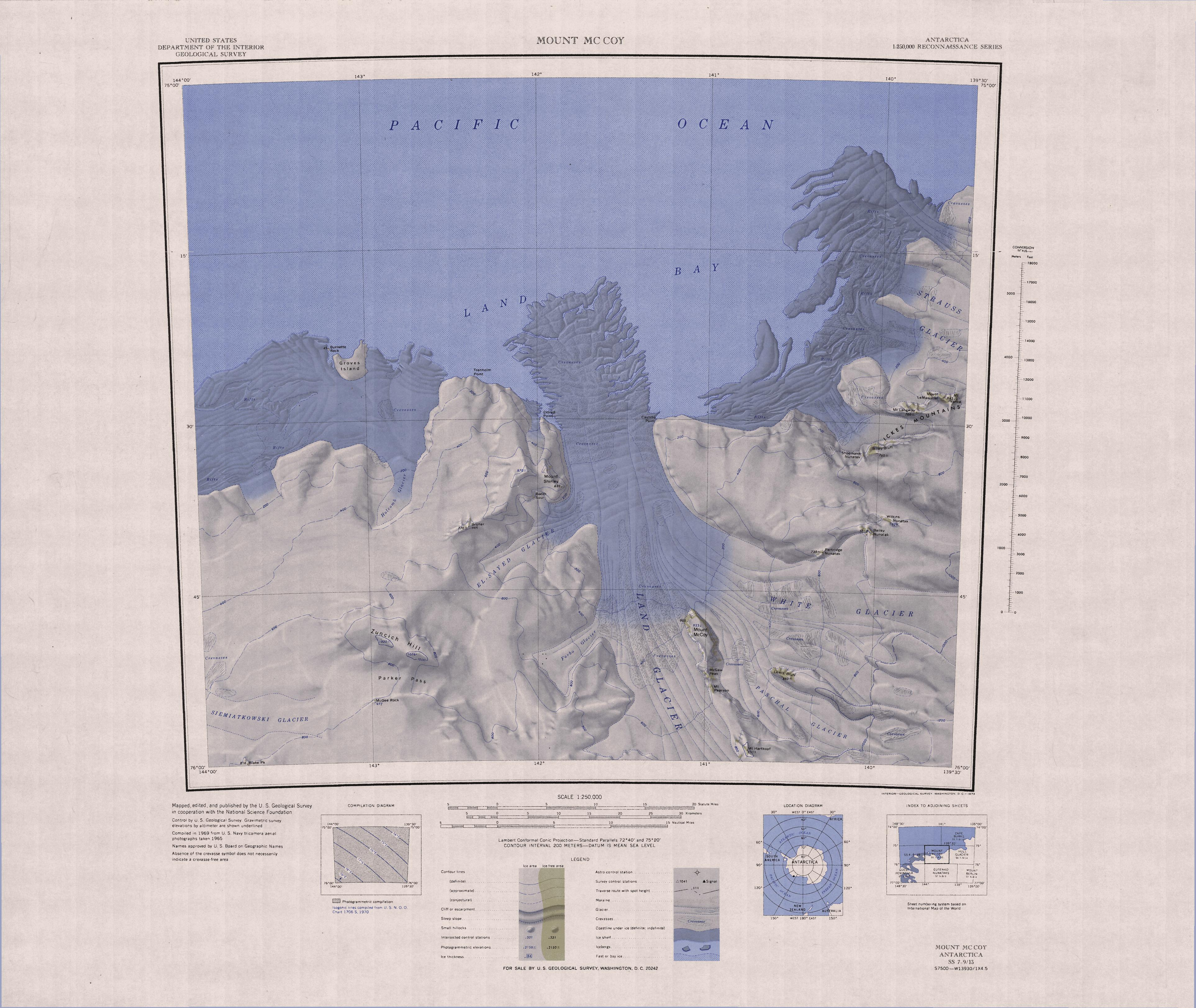
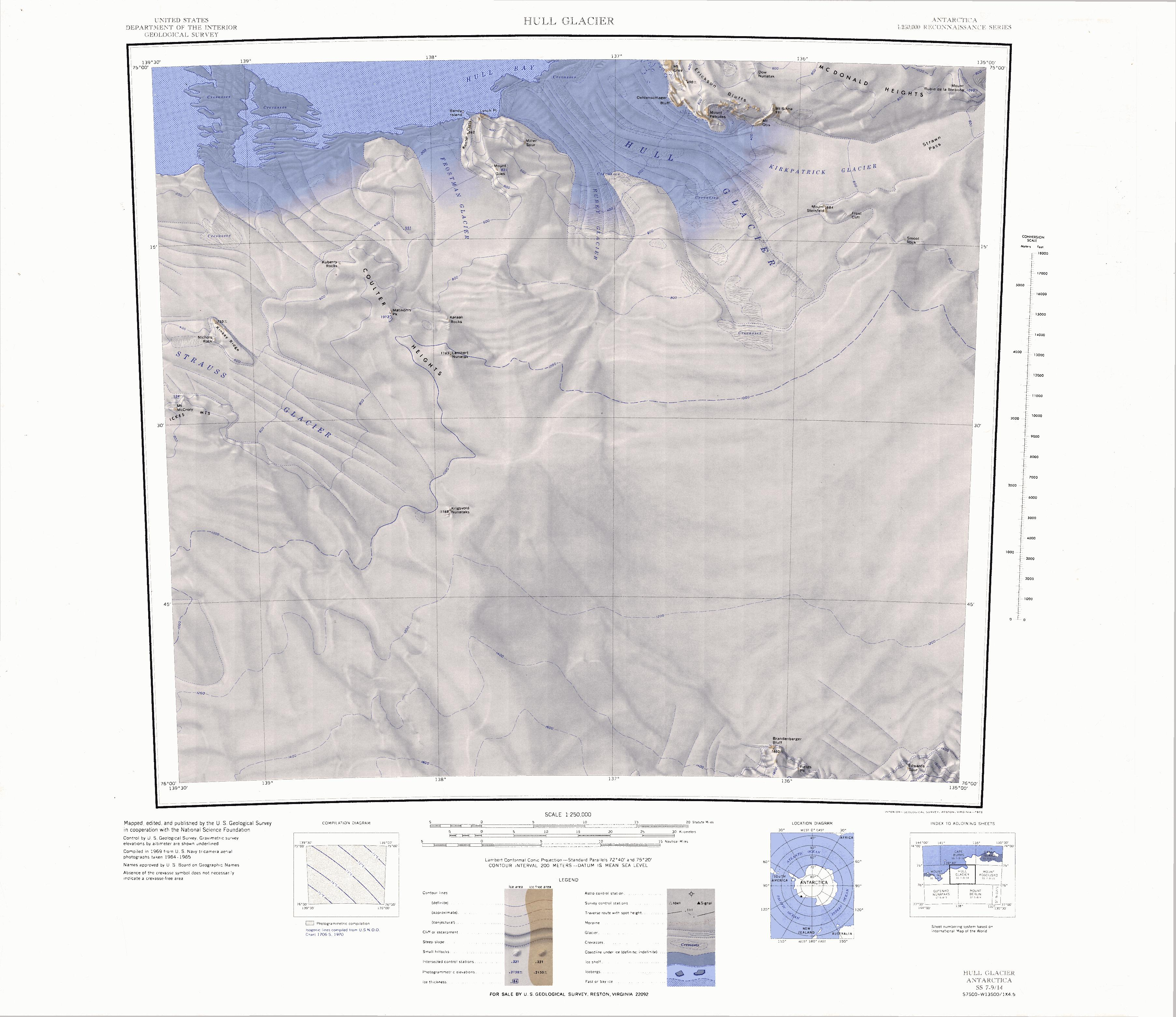
Strauss Glacier in north east of left map, northwest of right map

The Strauss Glacier originates to the south of the Coulter Heights and flows west to enter Land Bay to the east of the mouth of Land Glacier and west of the mouth of the Hull Glacier. It passes the Ickes Mountains to the south of its mouth. The Krigsvold Nunataks are at the head of the glacier. The Kinsey Ridge and Nichols Rock are in the glacier near its mouth.

== Features ==
=== Krigsvold Nunataks ===
75°38′S 137°55′W. A small cluster of isolated nunataks located directly at the head of Strauss Glacier. Mapped by USGS from surveys and United States Navy air photos, 1959-65. Named by US-ACAN after Sergeant Alvin I. Krigsvold, United States Army, member of the Army-Navy Trail Party that blazed a trail from Little America V to establish Byrd Station in 1956.

=== Kinsey Ridge ===
75°23′S 139°08′W. A flat-topped, partly ice-covered ridge in the middle of Strauss Glacier. Mapped by USGS from surveys and United States Navy air photos, 1959-65. Named by US-ACAN for James H. Kinsey, USARP auroral scientist at Byrd Station, 1963.

=== Nichols Rock ===
75°23′S 139°13′W. A rock on the west side of Kinsey Ridge, which lies in the middle of Strauss Glacier. Mapped by USGS from surveys and United States Navy air photos, 1959-65. Named by US-ACAN for Clayton W. Nichols, geophysicist at Byrd Station, 1969-70.

== Sources ==
- Alberts, Fred G., ed. (1995), Geographic Names of the Antarctic (PDF) (2 ed.), United States Board on Geographic Names This article incorporates public domain material from websites or documents of the United States Board on Geographic Names.
- Hull Glacier, USGS: United States Geological Survey
- Mount McCoy, USGS: United States Geological Survey
- This article incorporates public domain material from websites or documents of the United States Geological Survey.
