= Crosson Ice Shelf =

Ice shelf in Antarctica

The Crosson Ice Shelf (74°57′S 109°30′W) is an ice shelf, about 35 nautical miles (65 km; 40 mi) wide, located north and northeast of Mount Murphy along the Walgreen Coast of Marie Byrd Land, Antarctica. The ice shelf is nurtured by Smith Glacier, Pope Glacier, Vane Glacier, and Haynes Glacier.

== Location ==
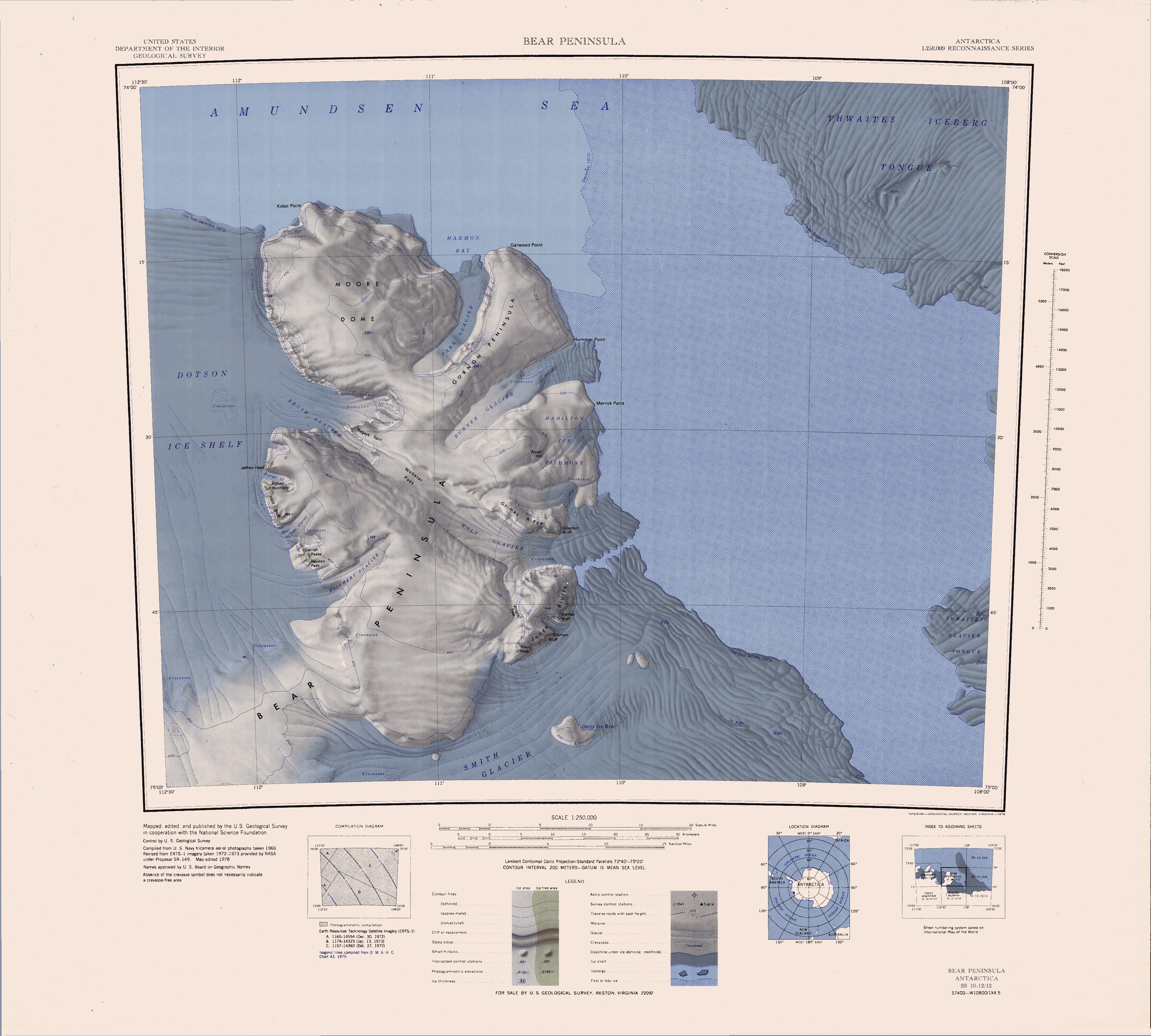
Crosson Ice Shelf in south center

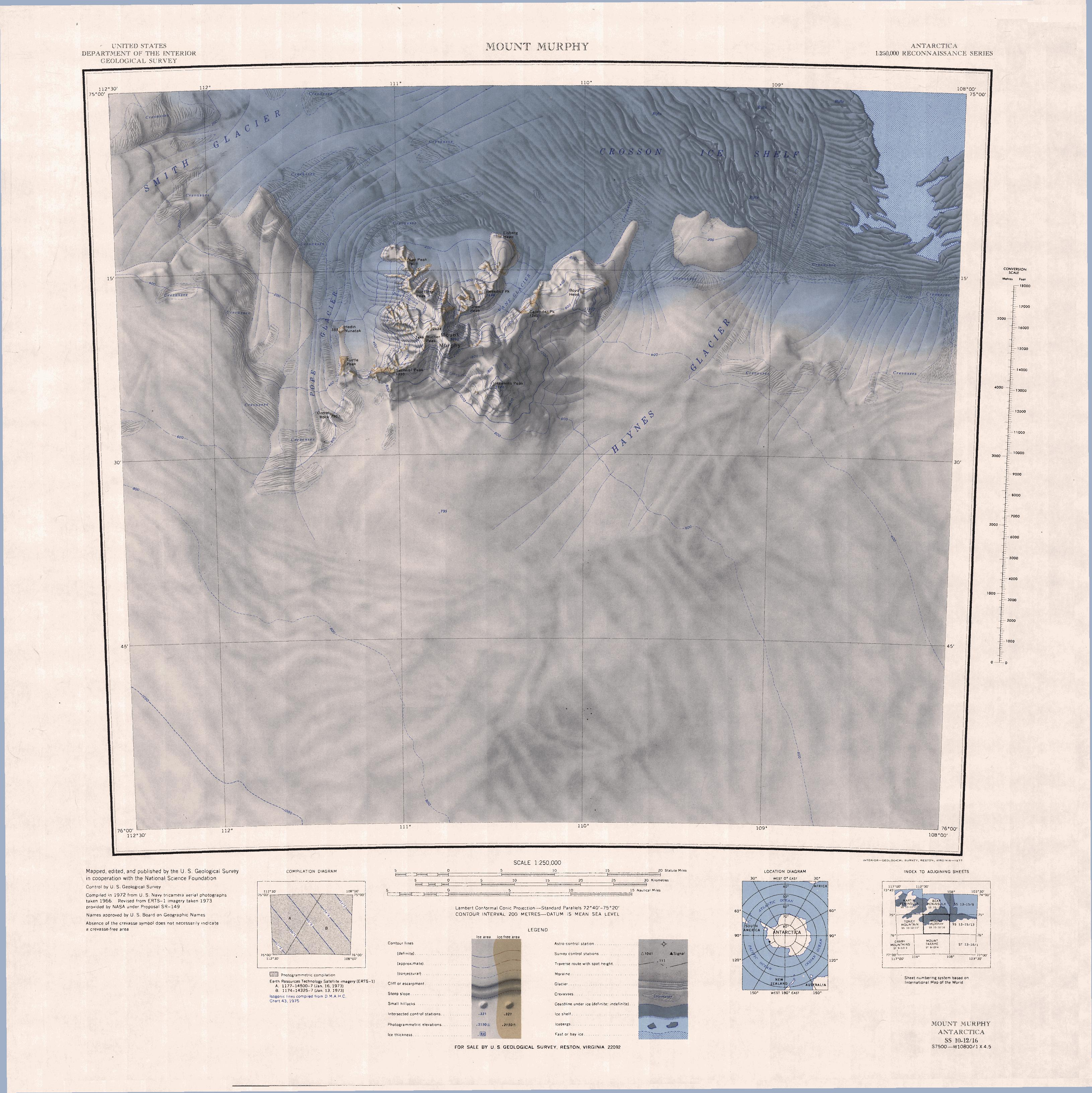
Crosson Ice Shelf in north center

The Crosson Ice Shelf extends northeast into the Amundsen Sea on the Walgreen Coast of Marie Byrd Land. The Bear Peninsula is on its northwest. The Mount Murphy massif is along its south edge.

== Mapping and name ==
Crosson Ice Shelf was mapped by the United States Geological Survey (USGS) from surveys and from United States Navy air photographs, 1959–66. It was named by the United States Advisory Committee on Antarctic Names (US-ACAN) for Commander W.E. Crosson, U.S. Navy, Commanding Officer of the Antarctic Construction Group during Operation Deep Freeze 1973.

== Sources ==
- Alberts, Fred G., ed. (1995), Geographic Names of the Antarctic (PDF) (2 ed.), United States Board on Geographic Names This article incorporates public domain material from websites or documents of the United States Board on Geographic Names.
- Bear Peninsula, USGS: United States Geological Survey
- Mount Murphy, USGS: United States Geological Survey
- This article incorporates public domain material from websites or documents of the United States Geological Survey.
