= Charles F. Passel =

American polar scientist (1915–2002)

Charles Fay Passel (April 9, 1915 – December 27, 2002) was a polar scientist responsible along with Paul Siple for the development of the wind chill factor parameter.

== Biography ==
Passel was born in Indianapolis, Indiana, on April 9, 1915, and graduated from Shortridge High School. He had a bachelor's degree in geology from Miami University (Ohio), and a master's degree from Indiana University Bloomington.

Passel was in the United States Antarctic Service. He was a major participant in the third Antarctic Expedition of Admiral Richard E. Byrd (1939–1941). Passel had several diverse duties on the expedition (as all the expedition members did) including as a dog team driver. His work with Siple was published in the American Philosophical Society

Following the expedition, he joined the United States Marine Corps in April 1942 during World War II and served until June 1943. He was wounded in action after serving in the Guadalcanal campaign and New Hebrides, and became a sergeant.

He died December 27, 2002, in Abilene, Texas, and is buried at Buffalo Gap Cemetery, Buffalo Gap, Texas.

== Legacy ==
Passel's diary is published as the book Ice.

== See also ==
- American Polar Society
- Mount Passel
- Warpasgiljo Glacier
