= Vornberger Glacier =

Glacier in Marie Byrd Land, Antarctica

Vornberger Glacier (73°55′S 125°4′W) is a glacier about 10 nautical miles (18 km) long draining the north side of Siple Island. Named by Advisory Committee on Antarctic Names (US-ACAN) after Patricia Vornberger, NASA, specialist in field and remotely sensed data studies of ice motion in West Antarctica from the 1980s to the present.
