= Warpasgiljo Glacier =

Glacier in Marie Byrd Land, Antarctica

- Arthur Davis Glacier
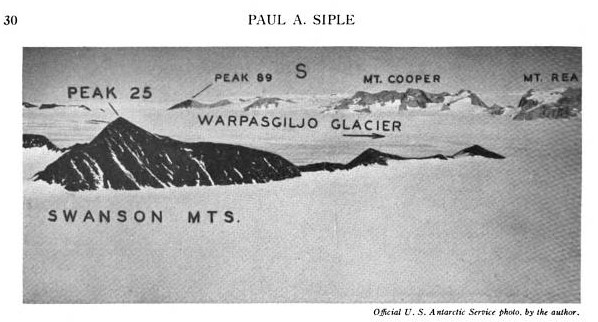
- Warpasgiljo Glacier as seen towards the South from an aerial view photograph on p30 of Proceedings, American Philosophical Society (vol. 89, 1945)

- Location within Antarctica
- Location: Marie Byrd Land
- Coordinates: 77°05′S 145°25′W
- Length: 25 mi (40 km)

Warpasgiljo Glacier is a valley glacier about 25 mi (40 km) long, flowing West to Sulzberger Ice Shelf between the Swanson Mountains on the North and Mounts Rea and Cooper on the South, in the Edsel Ford Ranges of Marie Byrd Land. This glacier was discovered by and named for the four Geological Party Expedition members of the West Base of the United States Antarctic Service (USAS), in aerial flights and from ground surveys in November–December 1940, as part of the Antarctic Expedition of 1939-1941 led by Rear Admiral Richard E. Byrd.

This glacier was later renamed Arthur Davis Glacier by US-SCAN for Rear Admiral Arthur C. Davis, an early leader in aviation in the United States Navy.

== West Base Geological Party Expedition ==
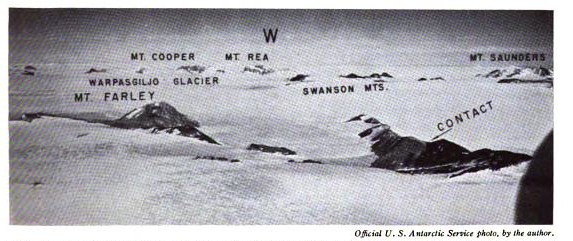
Warpasgiljo Glacier as seen towards the West from an aerial view photograph on p30 of Proceedings, American Philosophical Society (vol. 89, 1945)

In February 1940, shortly after West Base was set up in Little America III, Dr. Paul Siple directed an airplane flight from the West Base to the Edsel Ford Ranges to determine where exploration and geological work was to be done during the next summer season, and numerous aerial photographs were taken. During the long winter months that followed, fairly accurate maps were made of the Southern Edsel Ford Ranges. This is an area of approximately 7,000 square miles (18,000 km^{2}) of mountainous coastland in the northwestern region of Marie Byrd Land. During the 1940 winter night, a Geological Party Expedition of four men was organized and they prepared for the extremely long trek on two dog sleds to the Edsel Ford Ranges. The four-man party was composed of Lawrence A. Warner, leader and geologist, Charles F. Passel, geologist and radio operator, Harold P. Gilmour "Gil", recorder and collector of biological specimens and Loran Wells "Joe", photographer and observer.

The Geological Party's Expedition objective was to map and geologically survey as much of the southern portion of the Edsel Ford Range as possible, and additionally investigate the natural resources of the area and triangulate accurately for improved maps of the region. The four-man Geological Party Expedition left the West Base on October 17, 1940, and returned 82 days later on January 7, 1941, traveling a total of 691 nautical miles (1,280 km) on board their two dog sleds. In the nearly three-month expedition, they had to be supported by airplanes that deposited supplies at 100-mile (160 km) intervals along their charted route. The Geological Party Expedition explorers discovered and visited for the first time some 50 peaks, valleys and glaciers in this region and some 300 geological specimens were collected. Warpasgiljo Glacier was one of those features discovered.

All four explorers of the West Base Geological Party Expedition were awarded a Congressional Gold Medal, the highest civilian award of the United States that can be bestowed by Congress. This medal, designated the "United States Antarctic Expedition Medal" was awarded by a Special Act of Congress, authorized on September 24, 1945 (Public Law 185, 79th Congress), for their contribution to the success of the 1939-1941 Polar Exploration to Antarctica.

== Etymology ==
The extensive Warpasgiljo Glacier was discovered and named for the four members of the West Base Geological Party Expedition:

WARner + PASsel + GILmour + JOe = WARPASGILJO. It is believed that members of US-SCAN were unaware of the origin of this name.

=== Expedition Dog Sleds used in Little America III ===
During the 1939-1941 Expedition, dog sleds were the most reliable form of ground exploration in Antarctica. A dog sled team capable of transporting two men contained nine dogs. They could haul around 100 lb (45 kg) per dog, for a total of 900 lb (410 kg). For a 30-day expedition, some 550 lb (250 kg) of food were needed for the two men and the dogs. The other 350 lb (160 kg) were used for fuel and camping equipment. With good weather in the Antarctic summer, they could travel 10 knots (19 km/h) per day, or a total of 300 knots (560 km/h).
