= Nereson Glacier =

Glacier in Marie Byrd Land, Antarctica

Nereson Glacier (73°56′S 124°24′W) is a glacier about 5 nautical miles (9 km) long draining the north side of Siple Island. Named by Advisory Committee on Antarctic Names (US-ACAN) after Nadine A. Nereson, University of Washington, glaciologist whose research in West Antarctica during the 1990s focused on the history of ice flow, and the past and present stability of the ice sheet.
