= Land Bay =

Bay in Antarctica

- Location within Antarctica
- Location: Marie Byrd Land, Antarctica
- Coordinates: 75°25′S 141°45′W
- Ocean/sea sources: Pacific Ocean

Land Bay (75°25′S 141°45′W) is an ice-filled bay, about 40 nautical miles (74 km; 46 mi) wide, indenting the coast of Marie Byrd Land, Antarctica, just eastward of Groves Island. It was discovered by the United States Antarctic Service (USAS; 1939–41), and takes its name from Land Glacier which descends into the bay.

== Location ==
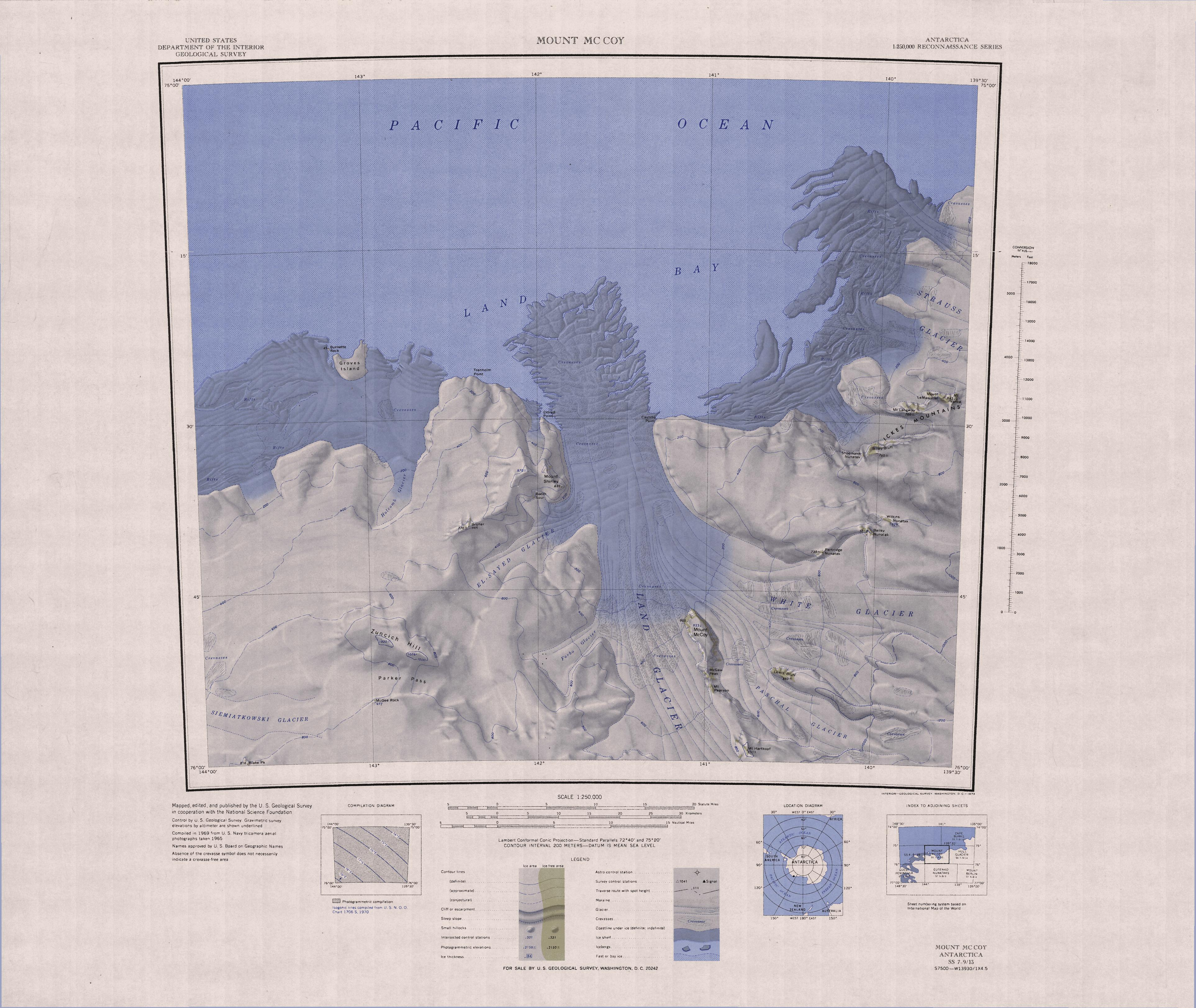
Land Bay and lower Land Glacier

Land Bay extends from just east of Groves Island and Burnette Rock. Holcomb Glacier flows north into the bay to the east of the island and the west of Trenholm Point. Land Glacier flows north into the bay between Eldred Point to the west and Castillo Point to the east. Further to the east Strauss Glacier flows into the bay to the northeast of the Ickes Mountains.

== Features ==
=== Groves Island ===
75°30′S 143°05′W. An ice-covered island 5 nautical miles (9.3 km; 5.8 mi) long, lying close off the coast of Marie Byrd Land between Siemiatkowski Glacier and Land Glacier. Mapped from surveys by the United States Geological Survey (USGS) and United States Navy air photos (1959-65). Named by the United States Advisory Committee on Antarctic Names (US-ACAN) for Benjamin F. Groves, meteorologist at Byrd Station, 1964.

=== Burnette Rock ===
75°23′S 143°13′W. A rock 45 metres (148 ft) high, lying 0.7 nautical miles (1.3 km; 0.81 mi) northwest of Groves Island. Named for Chief Warrant Officer Desmond Burnette, United States Army, helicopter pilot on the Marie Byrd Land Traverse, 1966-67. He was pilot of the first helicopter to land on this rock during the mapping control traverse with USGS topographic engineers. The name was suggested to US-ACAN by Charles E. Morrison, Jr., USGS who, with Burnette, Thomas Bray, USGS, and Sergeant Donald Bunner, United States Army, occupied and positioned this rock on December 4, 1966.

=== Holcomb Glacier ===
75°35′S 142°48′W. A glacier which drains northward to the coast of Marie Byrd Land 9 nautical miles (17 km; 10 mi) southeast of Groves Island. Mapped by USGS from surveys and United States Navy aerial photographs, 1959-65. Named by US-ACAN for Leroy G. Holcomb, ionospheric physicist at Byrd Station, 1971.

=== Trenholm Point ===
75°26′S 142°23′W. An ice-covered point 8 nautical miles (15 km; 9.2 mi) northwest of Eldred Point. It marks the northern end of the peninsula between Holcomb Glacier and El-Sayed Glacier. Mapped by USGS from surveys and United States Navy aerial photography, 1959-65. Named by US-ACAN for William L. Trenholm, glaciologist at Byrd Station in three summer seasons, 1967-70.

=== Eldred Point ===
75°30′S 141°58′W. An ice-covered point which marks the west side of the terminus of Land Glacier. Mapped by USGS from surveys and United States Navy aerial photographs, 1959-65. Named by US-ACAN for David T. Eldred, a member of the United States Navy winter-over support unit at McMurdo Station in 1958, 1965 and 1969.

=== Castillo Point ===
75°30′S 141°18′W. An ice-covered point which marks the east side of the terminus of Land Glacier. Mapped by USGS from surveys and United States Navy aerial photographs, 1959-65. Named by US-ACAN for Rudy Castillo, aerographer, United States Navy, with the Marie Byrd Land Survey party and at Hallett Station, respectively, during Operation Deep Freeze 1968 and 1969.

== Sources ==
- Alberts, Fred G., ed. (1995), Geographic Names of the Antarctic (PDF) (2 ed.), United States Board on Geographic Names This article incorporates public domain material from websites or documents of the United States Board on Geographic Names.
- Mount McCoy, USGS: United States Geological Survey

This article incorporates public domain material from websites or documents of the United States Geological Survey.
