= Scambos Glacier =

Glacier in Marie Byrd Land, Antarctica

Scambos Glacier (77°44′S 149°25′W) is a glacier about 35 nautical miles (60 km) long draining to the Sulzberger Ice Shelf. Named by Advisory Committee on Antarctic Names (US-ACAN) after Theodore A. Scambos, National Snow and Ice Data Center, Boulder, Colorado, expert in the use of remotely sensed data for field and theoretical studies of Antarctic ice behavior from the 1990s to the present. The region was first mapped by aerial photographs as part of Richard Byrd's Second Little America expedition in December, 1934. Prior to being named, Scambos Glacier and the surrounding western Sulzberger glaciers (Jacobel Glacier, Fahnestock Glacier, and the western portion of the ice shelf) were the subject of a glacier structure and flow speed analysis using Landsat images and other satellite data. Scambos Glacier has a peak flow speed of about 200 m per year.
