= Hulbe Glacier =

Glacier in Antarctica

Hulbe Glacier (73°47′S 125°55′W) is a glacier about 10 nautical miles (20 km) long draining the north side of Siple Island, Antarctica. It was named by the Advisory Committee on Antarctic Names after Christina Hulbe, faculty member of the University of Otago, New Zealand, and a theoretical and field researcher of ice motion in Antarctica.
