= Harold P. Gilmour =

Volunteer Antarctic explorer

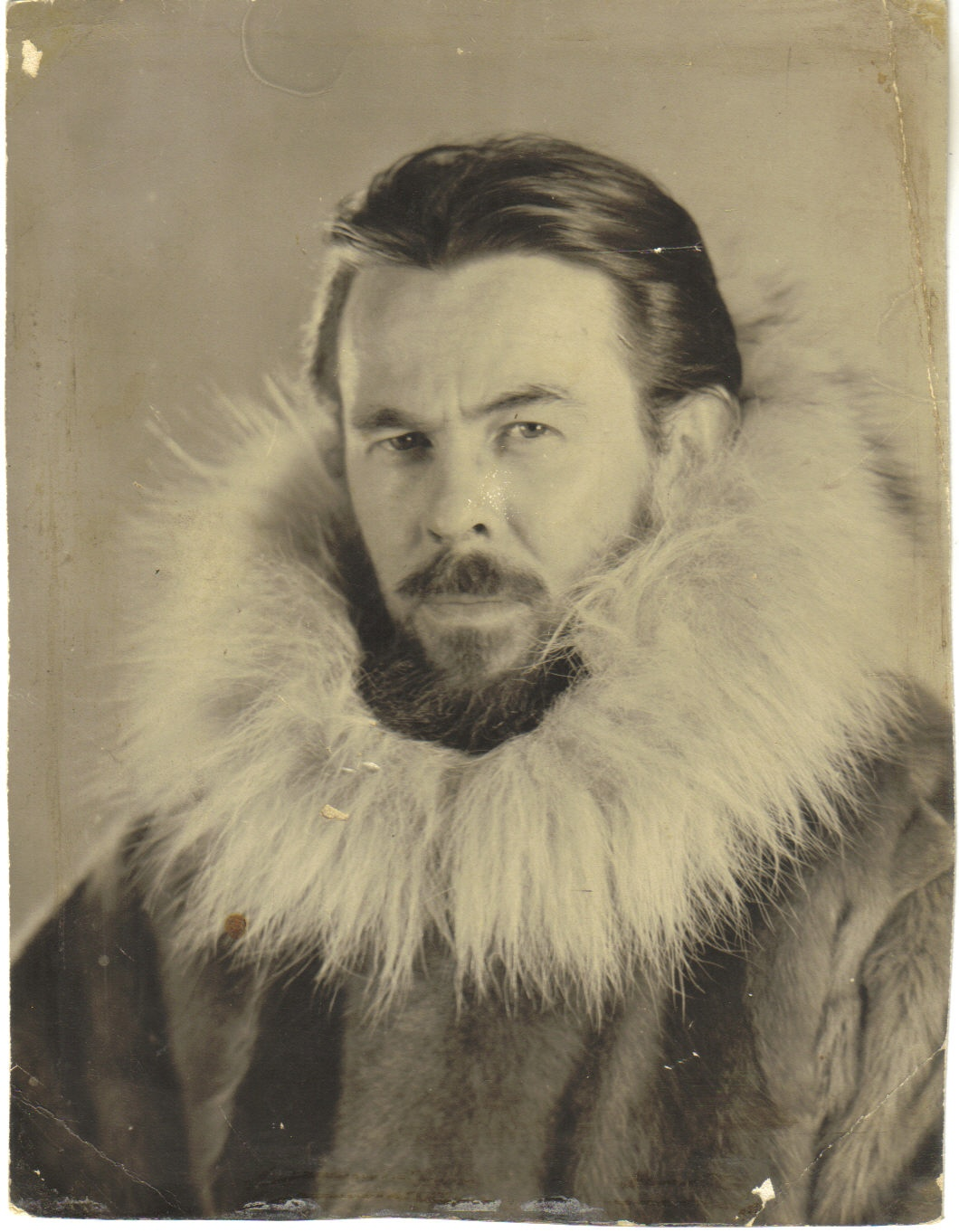
USAS official portrait of Gilmour

Harold Parker Gilmour (March 19, 1903 – April 16, 1969) was an American volunteer Antarctic explorer, at $1 per annum, for the 1939–1941 Byrd Polar Expedition to Antarctica, as part of the United States Antarctic Service. Mount Gilmour is named in his honor.

== Byrd Antarctic Expedition 1939–1941 ==
Gilmour was the administrative assistant to the expedition commander, Rear Admiral Richard E. Byrd, and was the official recorder and historian for the expedition. Gilmour made a daily official journal of all events, from the day they set sail on the USMS North Star on November 21, 1939, from the Navy Yard Pier 41 in Philadelphia, Pennsylvania, to the day they returned in 1941.

The vessel had originally set sail from Boston on November 15, 1939, after months of preparation for the voyage to Antarctica. The stop in Philadelphia was to load two planes on board. One was a single-engine Beechcraft to be used together with the Snow Cruiser, and the other was a twin-engine Condor to be used at the West Base for geological exploratory flights. Gilmour's recordings have been deposited in the National Archives in Washington, D.C.

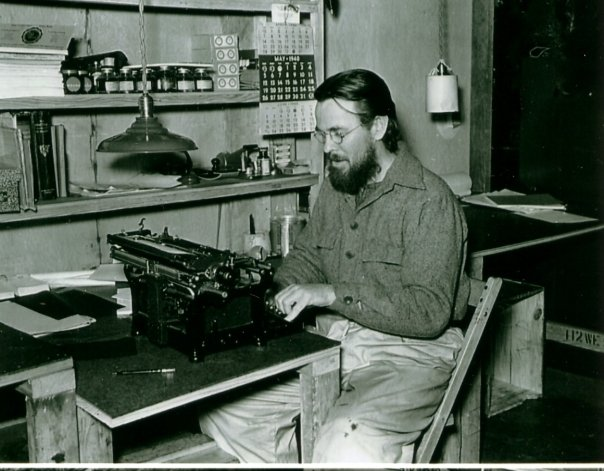
Gilmour at the West Base in May 1940

The expedition mapped and geologically surveyed most of the southern portion of the Edsel Ford Range, and also investigated the different natural resources of the area. They triangulated and measured to create improved maps of the region. In the nearly three-month expedition, they had to be supported by airplanes that deposited supplies at 100-mile intervals along their charted route. The expedition visited for the first time some 50 peaks in this region and some 300 geological specimens were collected. Mount Gilmour was one of those peaks and was named in honor of Gilmour.

Gilmour died in Viña del Mar, Chile at the age of 66, and is buried at the historical Cemetery Number 1 in Valparaíso, Chile.
