= Fahnestock Glacier =

Glacier in Antarctica

Fahnestock Glacier (77°53′S 149°41′W) is a glacier about 30 nautical miles (60 km) long draining to the Sulzberger Ice Shelf. It was named by the Advisory Committee on Antarctic Names after Mark A. Fahnestock, a faculty member of the University of New Hampshire, who was a field and theoretical researcher in Greenland and in the West Antarctic Ice Stream area from the 1980s onwards.
