= Mount Murphy =

Mountain in Marie Byrd Land, Antarctica

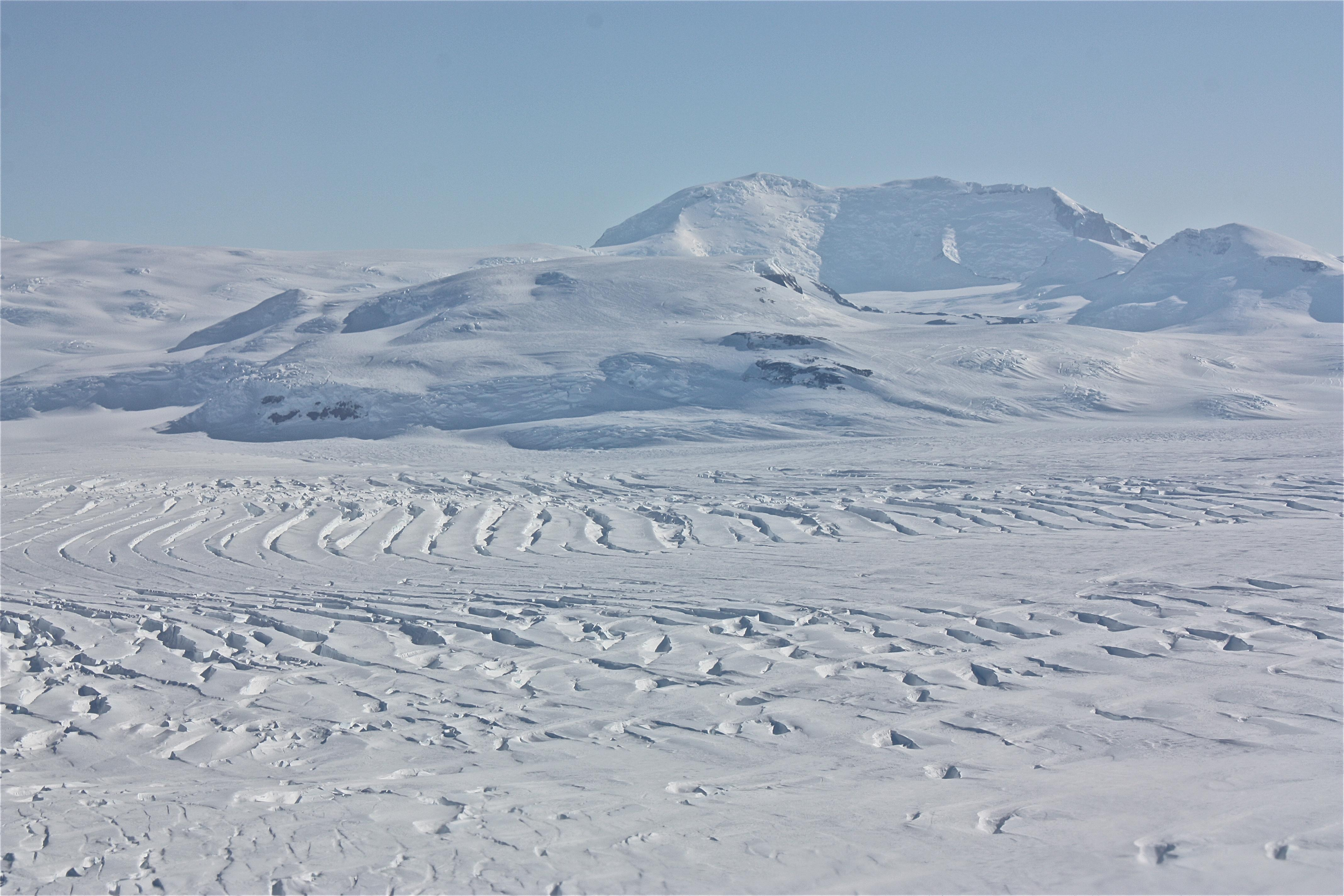
- Aerial view of Mount Murphy

Highest point
- Elevation: 2,705 m (8,875 ft)
- Prominence: 2,055 m (6,742 ft)
- Listing: Ultra, Ribu
- Coordinates: 75°20′S 110°44′W

Geography
- Location within Antarctica
- Location: Marie Byrd Land, Antarctica

Geology
- Rock age: Unknown
- Mountain type: Shield volcano
- Volcanic field: Marie Byrd Land Volcanic Province
- Last eruption: Pleistocene

Mount Murphy (75°20′S 110°44′W) is a snow-covered mountain with steep, rocky slopes rising to 2,634 metres (8,642 ft) in Marie Byrd Land, Antarctica. It is directly south of Bear Peninsula and is bounded by Smith Glacier, Pope Glacier, and Haynes Glacier. Volcanic activity began in the Miocene with the eruption of basaltic and trachytic lava. Volcanism on the slopes of the volcano resumed much later during the Pleistocene, with a parasitic cone having been K–Ar dated to 0.9 million years old.

== Location ==
The Mount Murphy massif lies on the south shore of the Crosson Ice Shelf, which extends into the Amundsen Sea on the Walgreen Coast of Marie Byrd Land. The Haynes Glacier flows into the ice shelf to its east, and the Pope Glacier flows into the ice shelf to the west. The Roos Glacier and Vane Glacier flow from the massif towards the ice shelf. Features, clockwise from the northwest, include Kay Peak, Buettner Peak, Grew Peak, Benedict Peak, Eisberg Head, Callender Peak, Boyd Head, Hawkins Peak, Bucher Peak, Sechrist Peak, Dorrel Rock, Turtle Peak, Hedin Nunatak.

== Mapping and name ==
Mount Murphy was delineated from aerial photographs taken by United States Navy Operation Highjump in January 1947. It was named by the United States Advisory Committee on Antarctic Names (US-ACAN) for Robert Cushman Murphy of the American Museum of Natural History, noted authority on Antarctic and sub-Antarctic bird life. While serving on the whaler, he charted the Bay of Isles region of South Georgia.

== Glaciers ==
=== Haynes Glacier ===
75°25′S 109°30′W. A broad glacier flowing to Walgreen Coast, to the east of Mount Murphy. Mapped by the United States Geological Survey (USGS) from surveys and United States Navy air photos, 1959–66. Named by US-ACAN after Major John W. Haynes, USMC, aircraft pilot on Operation Deep Freeze 1967 and 1968, who made a photographic flight over this glacier on January 1, 1967.

=== Pope Glacier ===
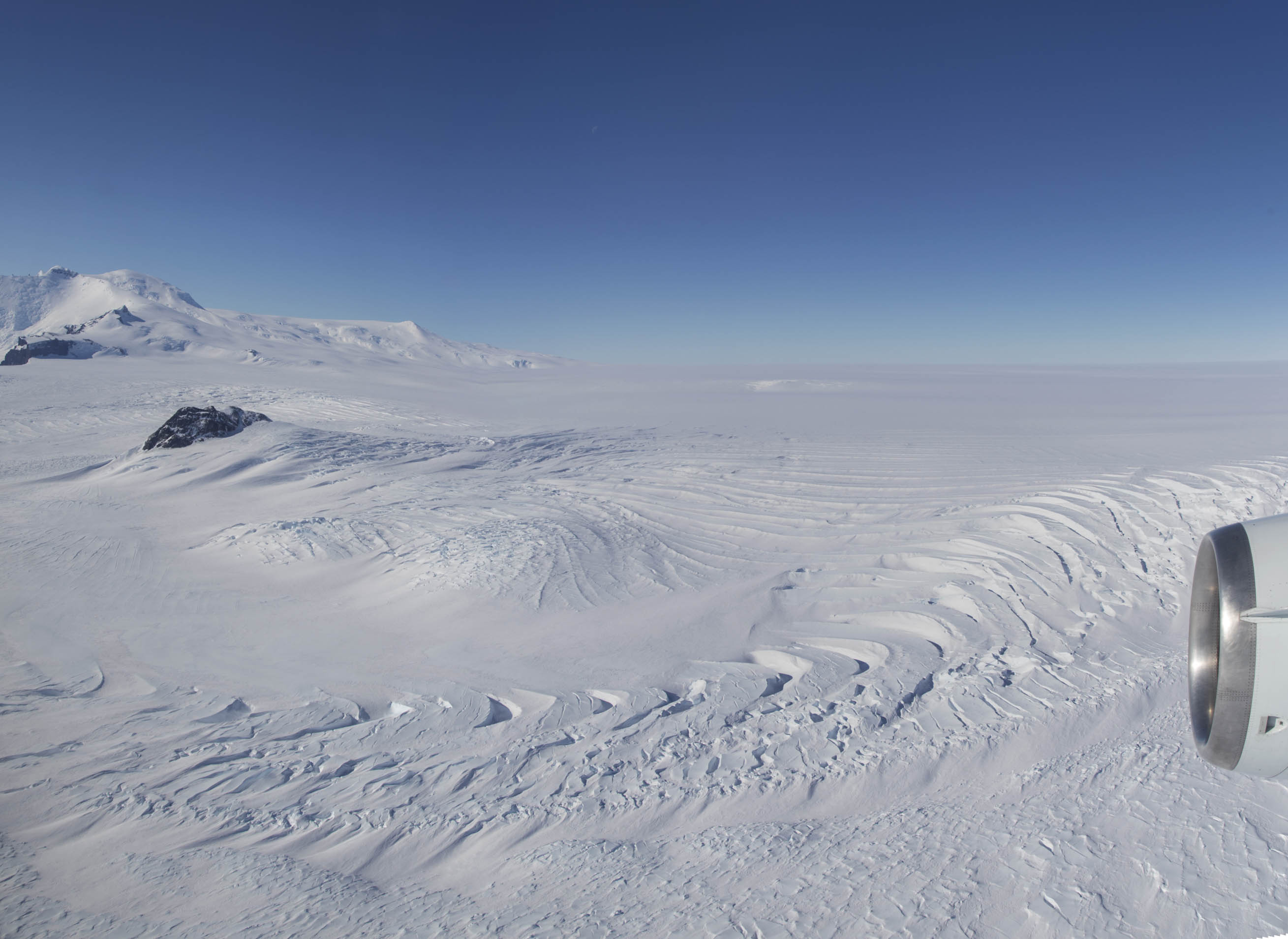
Pope Glacier in November 2016

75°19′S 111°22′W. A glacier about 20 nautical miles (37 km; 23 mi) long, flowing north along the west side of Mount Murphy to Crosson Ice Shelf. Mapped by USGS from surveys and United States Navy air photos, 1959–66. Named by US-ACAN after Major Donald R. Pope, (CE) United States Army, civil engineer on the staff of the Commander, Naval Support Force, Antarctica, 1965–67.

=== Roos Glacier ===
75°17′S 110°57′W. A steep glacier that drains the northwest slopes of Mount Murphy. Named by US-ACAN after S. Edward Roos, oceanographer with the Byrd Antarctic Expeditions of 1928-30 and 1933–35.

=== Vane Glacier ===
75°15′S 110°19′W. A broad glacier that drains the northeast slopes of Mount Murphy. It enters Crosson Ice Shelf between Eisberg Head and Boyd Head. Mapped by USGS from surveys and United States Navy air photos, 1959–66. Named by US-ACAN for Gregg A. Vane, United States Exchange Scientist at the Soviet station Novolazerevskaya in 1972.

== Features ==
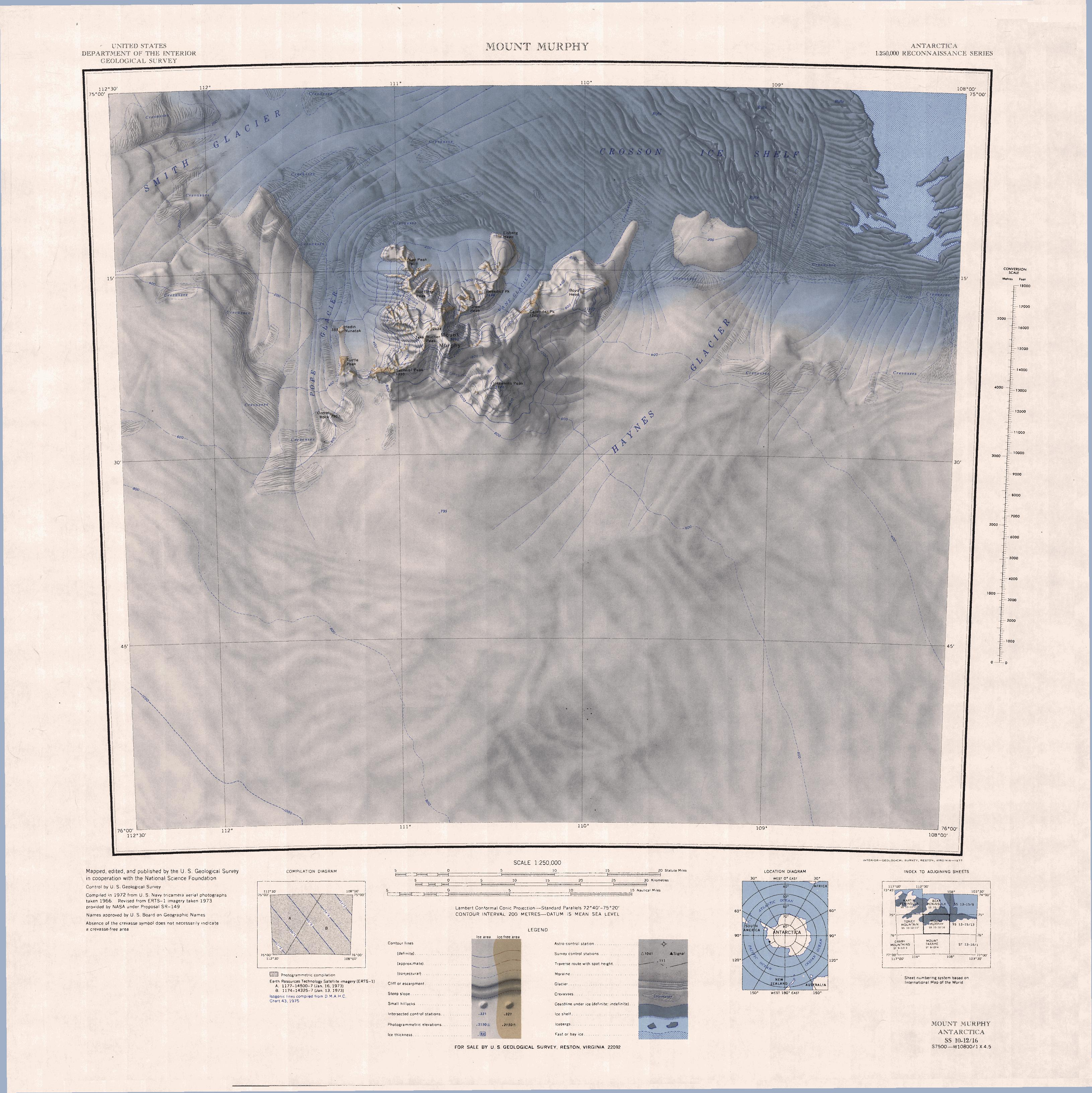
Mount Murphy in upper center of map

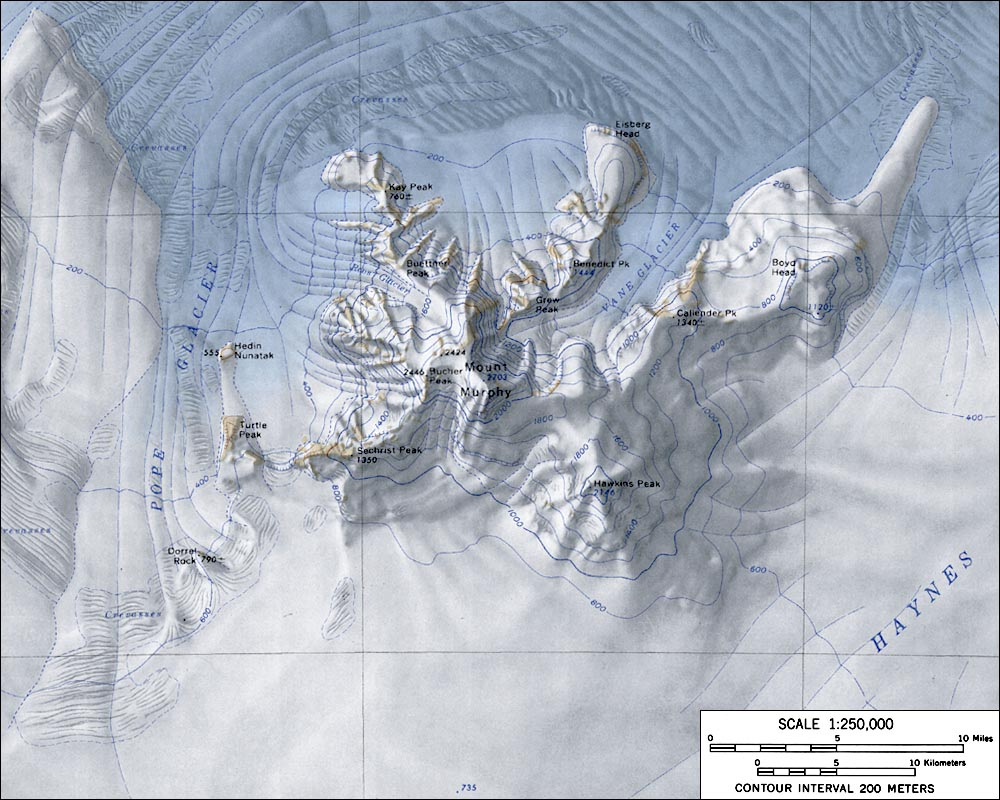
Mount Murphy

=== Kay Peak ===
75°14′S 110°57′W. A pyramidal peak, 760 metres (2,490 ft) high, near the end of the large spur descending northwest from the Mount Murphy massif. Mapped by USGS from surveys and United States Navy air photos, 1959–66. Named by US-ACAN for Lieutenant Commander W. Kay, United States Navy, leader of the Construction Unit at South Pole Station during Operation Deep Freeze 1973.

=== Buettner Peak ===
75°17′S 110°55′W. A sharp peak rising midway along the north wall of Roos Glacier in the northwest part of the Mount Murphy massif. Mapped by USGS from surveys and United States Navy aerial photographs, 1959–66. Named by US-ACAN for Robert J. Buettner (1914–75), manager of contract logistics support provided to the United States Antarctic program by Holmes and Narver, Inc. This work took him to Antarctica at least five times between 1969 and 1974.

=== Grew Peak ===
75°18′S 110°37′W. A peak over 1,400 metres (4,600 ft) high, one of several named peaks on the Mount Murphy massif. The feature is located on the northeast spur of the massif, between Benedict Peak and the loftier summit peaks. Mapped by USGS from surveys and United States Navy air photos, 1959–66. Named by US-ACAN for Edward Grew, United States Exchange Scientist to the Soviet Antarctic station Molodezhnaya in 1973.

=== Benedict Peak ===
75°17′S 110°32′W. A sharp, mostly ice-covered subsidiary peak standing 6 nautical miles (11 km; 6.9 mi) northeast of the summit of Mount Murphy. Mapped by USGS from surveys and United States Navy air photos, 1959–66. Named by US-ACAN for Philip C. Benedict, aurora researcher at Byrd Station in 1966.

=== Eisberg Head ===
75°12′S 110°27′W. A headland consisting of steep cliffs marked by rocky exposures, located just west of the mouth of Vane Glacier. The headland is the north extremity of a mountainous ridge descending from the central part of the Mount Murphy massif. Mapped by USGS from surveys and United States Navy air photos, 1959–66. Named by US-ACAN for Commander (later Captain) Harry B. Eisberg, United States Navy, Staff Medical Officer on Operation Highjump, 1946–47.

=== Callender Peak ===
75°18′S 110°18′W. Precipitous, mainly ice-covered subsidiary peak on the Mount Murphy massif, located 9 nautical miles (17 km; 10 mi) east-northeast of the summit of Mount Murphy. First mapped by USGS from air photos obtained in January 1947 by United States Navy Operation Highjump. Named by US-ACAN after Lieutenant Gordon W. Callender (CEC), United States Navy, officer in charge of Byrd Station in 1966.

=== Boyd Head ===
75°17′S 110°01′W. Prominent headland close east of the mouth of Vane Glacier on the coast of Marie Byrd Land. It rises over 1,000 metres (3,300 ft) high and has rock exposed to seaward. Mapped by USGS from surveys and United States Navy air photos, 1959–66. Named by US-ACAN for Captain Hugh F. Boyd III, United States Army, Construction Projects Officer during Operation Deep Freeze 1972 and 1973.

=== Hawkins Peak ===
75°24′S 110°29′W. A small summit peak on a mostly ice covered and rounded mass located 7 nautical miles (13 km; 8.1 mi) southeast of Mount Murphy. Mapped by USGS from surveys and United States Navy air photos, 1959–66. Named by US-ACAN for Major Billy R. Hawkins, a member of the United States Army Aviation Detachment in Antarctica, 1966–67.

=== Bucher Peak ===
75°20′S 110°52′W. One of the highest peaks 2,445 metres (8,022 ft) high in the west-central summit area of the Mount Murphy massif. Mapped by USGS from surveys and United States Navy air photos, 1959–66. Named by US-ACAN for noted American geologist Walter H. Bucher, Professor of Geology at Columbia University, 1940–56.

=== Sechrist Peak ===
75°23′S 111°02′W. A peak 1,350 metres (4,430 ft) high on the southwest spur of the Mount Murphy massif. Mapped by USGS from surveys and United States Navy air photos, 1959–66. Named by US-ACAN for Frank S. Sechrist, United States Exchange Scientist at the Soviet Molodezhnaya station in 1975.

=== Dorrel Rock ===
75°26′S 111°22′W. A rock outcrop 11 nautical miles (20 km; 13 mi) southwest of the summit of Mount Murphy, protruding through the ice near the head of Pope Glacier. Mapped by USGS from surveys and United States Navy air photos, 1959–66. Named by US-ACAN after Leo E. Dorrel, United States Navy, hospital corpsman with the Byrd Station winter party, 1966.

=== Turtle Peak ===
75°22′S 111°18′W. Conspicuous, nearly bare rock summit rising to 600 nautical miles (1,100 km; 690 mi) south of Hedin Nunatak. The peak is joined at its south side to an ice-covered spur which descends southwest from Mount Murphy. Mapped by USGS from surveys and United States Navy air photos, 1959–66. Named by US-ACAN after John P. Turtle, aurora researcher at Byrd Station in 1962.

=== Hedin Nunatak ===
75°19′S 111°18′W. A conspicuous nunatak with a flat top capped with ice and steep bare rock walls, standing 9 nautical miles (17 km; 10 mi) west-northwest of the summit of Mount Murphy. First roughly mapped from air photos taken in January 1947 by United States Navy Operation Highjump. Named by US-ACAN after Alan E. Hedin, aurora researcher at Byrd Station in 1962.

== Sources ==
- Alberts, Fred G., ed. (1995), Geographic Names of the Antarctic (PDF) (2 ed.), United States Board on Geographic Names This article incorporates public domain material from websites or documents of the United States Board on Geographic Names.
- Mount Murphy, USGS: United States Geological Survey
- This article incorporates public domain material from websites or documents of the United States Geological Survey.
