= Land Glacier =

Glacier descending into Land Bay in Marie Byrd Land, Antarctica

Butler Glacier
- Location within Antarctica
- Location: Marie Byrd Land, Antarctica
- Coordinates: 75°40′S 141°45′W
- Terminus: Land Bay

The Land Glacier (75°40′S 141°45′W) is a broad, heavily crevassed glacier, about 35 nautical miles (65 km; 40 mi) long, descending into Land Bay in Marie Byrd Land, Antarctica. It was discovered by the United States Antarctic Service (1939–41) and named for Rear Admiral Emory S. Land, Chairman of the United States Maritime Commission.

== Location ==
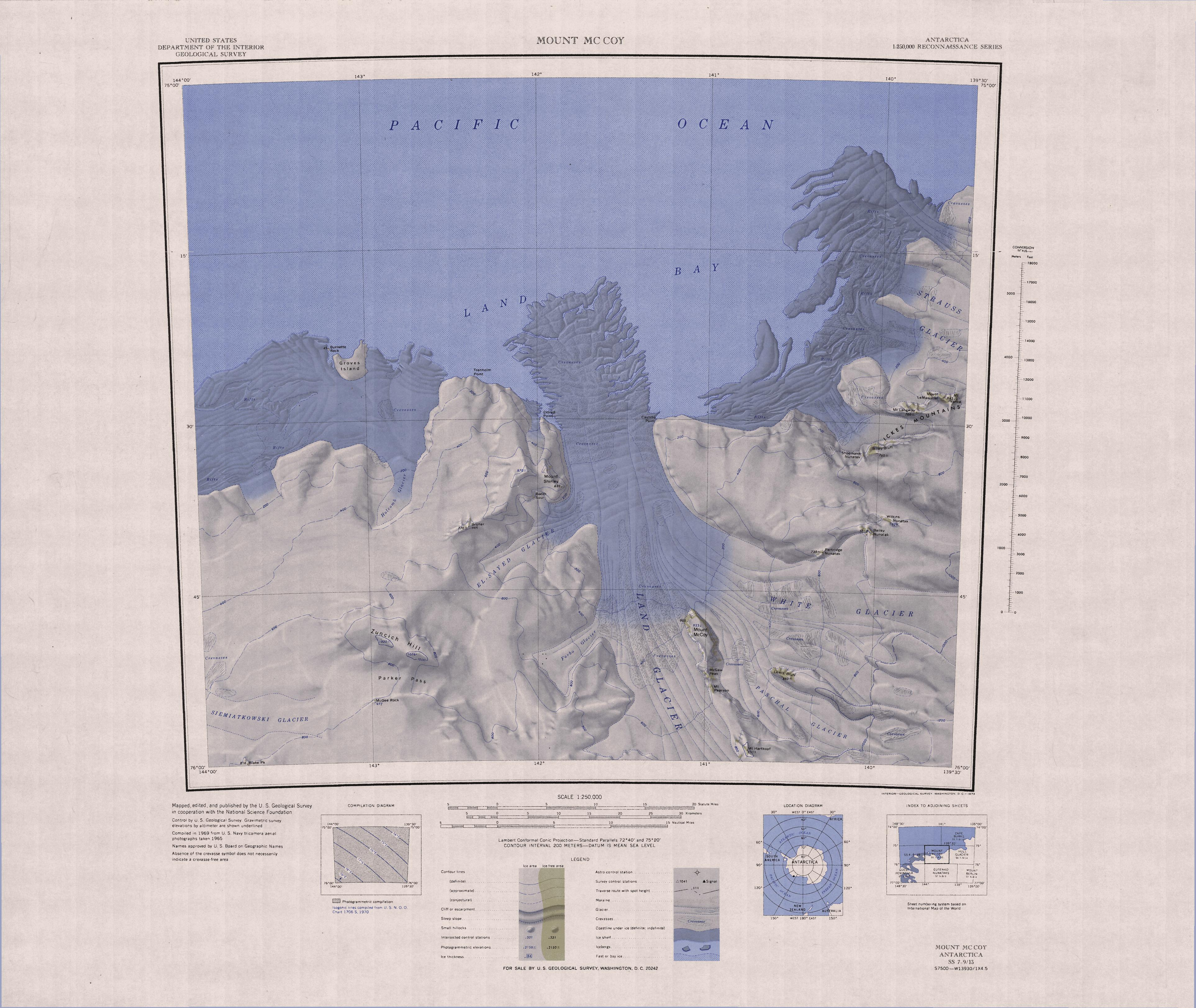
Land Bay and lower Land Glacier

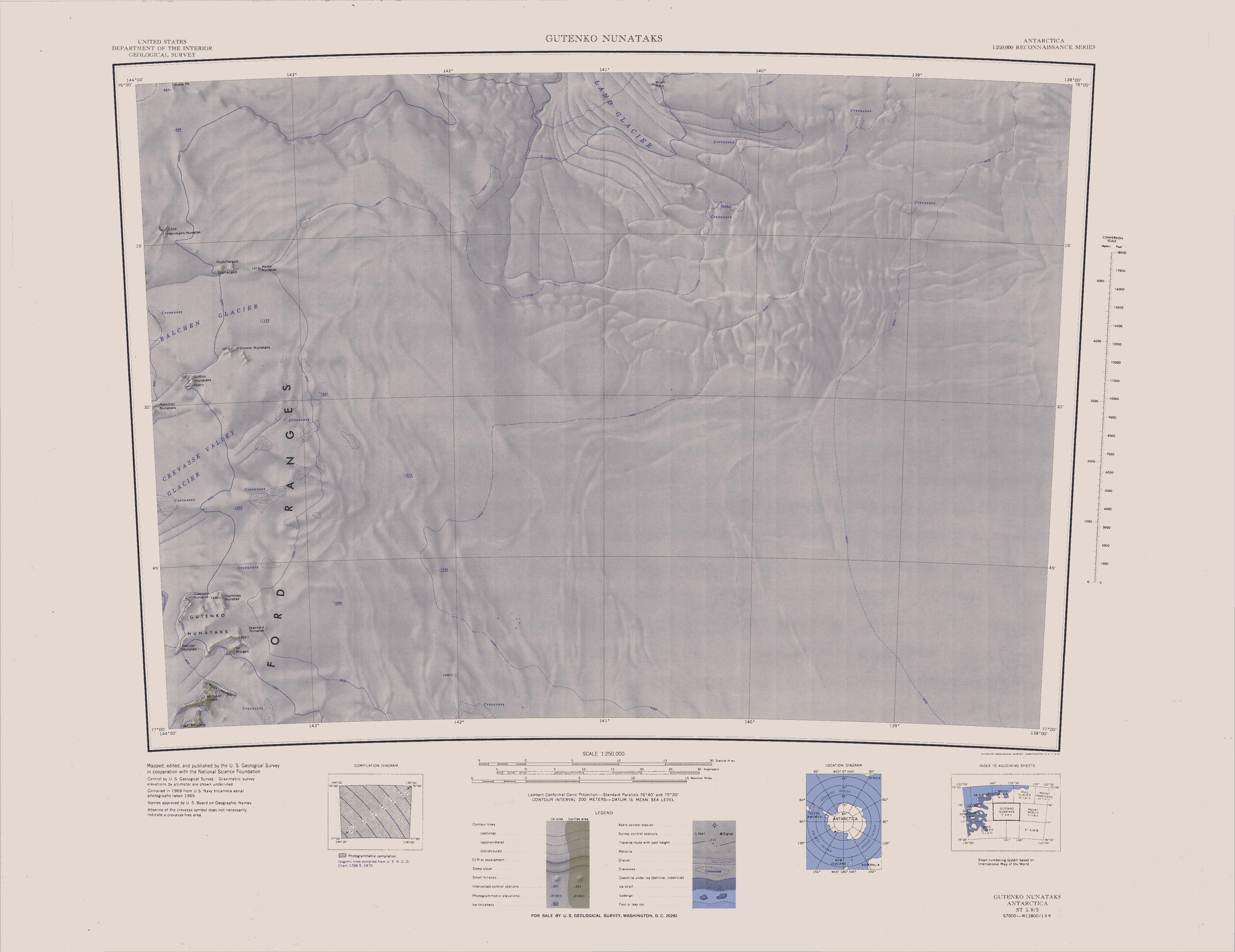
Upper Land Glacier

The Land Glacier flows north from the ice field to the northeast of the west-flowing Balchen Glacier and Crevasse Valley Glacier. Milan Rock is to the east of its upper section. It flows past the west side of the ridge that includes Mount Hartkopf, Pearson Peak (formerly Mount Pearson), McGraw Peak and Mount McCoy, where it is joined from the east by the combined Paschal Glacier and White Glacier. Castillo Point defines the eastern point of its mouth.

From its west it is joined by Farbo Glacier and El-Sayed Glacier, which both descend from the heights of Zuncich Hill and McGee Rock. Between these two, it saddles at Parker Pass with the west-flowing Siemiatkowski Glacier. Bruner Hill, Booth Spur and Mount Shirley are to the north of El-Sayed Glacier. Eldred Point defines the western point of the Land Glacier's mouth on Land Bay.

== Eastern features ==
Features on the east (right) side of the Land Glacier include, from south to north:

=== Milan Rock ===
76°01′S 140°41′W. A rock along the eastern margin of Land Glacier, 2 nautical miles (3.7 km; 2.3 mi) southeast of Mount Hartkopf. It is the southernmost outcrop near the head of the glacier. Mapped by the United States Geological Survey (USGS) from surveys and United States Navy aerial photography, 1959-65. Named by the United States Advisory Committee on Antarctic Names (US-ACAN) for Frederick T. Milan, aviation structural mechanic, United States Navy, a member of Squadron VX-6 air crew on LC-130 aircraft for several seasons; crew member on first midwinter flight to Antarctica, June 25, 1964.

=== Mount Hartkopf ===
75°59′S 140°45′W. A mountain, 1,110 metres (3,640 ft) high, rising along the east side of the upper reaches of Land Glacier, 11 nautical miles (20 km; 13 mi) southeast of Mount McCoy. Mapped by USGS from surveys and United States Navy air photos, 1959-65. Named by US-ACAN for Kenneth W. Hartkopt USARP ionospheric physicist at Byrd Station, 1963.

=== Pearson Peak ===
75°54′S 140°57′W. A rock peak rising 1 nautical mile (1.9 km; 1.2 mi) south of McGaw Peak on the ridge that trends south from Mount McCoy. Mapped by USGS from surveys and United States Navy air photos, 1959-65. Named by US-ACAN for Herbert E. Pearson, USARP geomagnetician and seismologist at Byrd Station, 1963.

=== McGaw Peak ===
75°52′S 140°59′W. A prominent peak over 800 metres (2,600 ft) high on the ridge between Land Glacier and Paschal Glacier in Marie Byrd Land. It stands midway between Mount McCoy and Pearson Peak. Mapped by USGS from surveys and United States Navy aerial photographs, 1959-65. Named by US-ACAN for Major Hugh R.L. McGaw, United States Army, Logistics Research Officer on the staff of the Commander, United States Naval Support Force, Antarctica, during Operation Deep Freeze 1971 and 1972.

=== Mount McCoy ===
75°52′S 141°10′W. A high table-topped massif with dark, snow-free, vertical walls, at the east side of Land Glacier. Discovered by members of West Base of the USAS (1939–41) and named for James C. McCoy, chief pilot at West Base.

=== Paschal Glacier ===
75°54′S 140°40′W. A glacier about 20 nautical miles (37 km; 23 mi) long and 4 nautical miles (7.4 km; 4.6 mi) wide, draining northwest between two ridges, the terminal points of which are Mount McCoy and Lewis Bluff. The lower end of this glacier merges with the flow of White Glacier and the larger Land Glacier near Mount McCoy before the latter feature debouches into Land Bay. Paschal Glacier was photographed from aircraft of the USAS, 1939–41, and was mapped by USGS from surveys and United States Navy aerial photography, 1959-65. Named by US-ACAN for Evans W. Paschal, Scientific Leader at Byrd Station, 1970.

=== White Glacier ===
75°45′S 140°50′W. A broad westward flowing tributary glacier which joins the Land Glacier on the north side of Mount McCoy. Mapped by USGS from surveys and United States Navy air photos, 1959-65. Named by US-ACAN for Gen. Thomas D. White, United States Air Force, Chief of Staff and member of the Joint Chiefs of Staff, 1957-61, who participated in the planning and organizational stages of Operation Deep Freeze in an administrative capacity and in matters relating to aircraft. Application of the name was proposed by Admiral Richard E. Byrd.

== Western features ==
Features on the west (left) side of the Land Glacier include, from south to north:

=== Farbo Glacier ===
75°50′S 141°45′W. A tributary glacier which drains northeastward and enters the Land Glacier 8 nautical miles (15 km; 9.2 mi) west of Mount McCoy. Mapped by USGS from surveys and United States Navy aerial photographs, 1959-65. Named by US-ACAN for Richard R. Farbo, equipment operator, United States Navy, who wintered-over in Antarctica on three expeditions of Operation Deep Freeze. He was at McMurdo Station in 1959 and 1965, and the South Pole Station in 1969.

=== El-Sayed Glacier ===
75°40′S 141°52′W. A glacier about 15 nautical miles (28 km; 17 mi) long which drains the northeast slopes of Zuncich Hill. It flows northeast to enter Land Glacier at the south side of Mount Shirley. Mapped by USGS from surveys and United States Navy air photos, 1959-65. Named by US-ACAN for Sayed Z. El-Sayed, USARP oceanographer on the International Weddell Sea Oceanographic Expedition, 1967-68 and 1969-70.

=== Zuncich Hill ===
75°50′S 142°51′W. A broad, ice-covered hill 1,075 metres (3,527 ft) high rising between the heads of Siemiatkowski Glacier and El-Sayed Glacier. Mapped by USGS from surveys and United States Navy air photos, 1959-65. Named by US-ACAN for Lieutenant Joseph L. Zuncich, United States Navy Reserve, navigator in LC-130F Hercules aircraft on Operation Deep Freeze 1968.

=== McGee Rock ===
75°54′S 142°59′W. An isolated rock at the south side of Parker Pass, about 5 nautical miles (9.3 km; 5.8 mi) south of Zuncich Hill, in Marie Byrd Land. Mapped by USGS from surveys and United States Navy air photos, 1959-65. Named by US-ACAN for Wayne R. McGee, EO3, United States Navy, Equipment Operator at Byrd Station, 1966.

=== Parker Pass ===
75°53′S 142°48′W. A broad ice-covered pass on the south side of Zuncich Hill. It leads from the head of Siemiatkowski Glacier to the névé area lying southwest of El-Sayed Glacier. Mapped by USGS from surveys and United States Navy air photos, 1959-65. Named by US-ACAN for Dana C. Parker, USARP geophysicist at McMurdo Station, 1967-68.

=== Bruner Hill ===
75°39′S 142°25′W. A hill 770 metres (2,530 ft) high which is snow covered except for some exposed rock on the north face. It rises at the north side of El-Sayed Glacier, 8 nautical miles (15 km; 9.2 mi) southwest of Mount Shirley. Mapped by USGS from surveys and United States Navy aerial photographs, 1959-65. Named by US-ACAN for Lieutenant Michael J. Bruner, United States Navy, LC-130 aircraft commander during Operation Deep Freeze 1970 and 1971.

=== Booth Spur ===
75°37′S 142°01′W. A small rock spur at the north side of El-Sayed Glacier and 1.5 nautical miles (2.8 km; 1.7 mi) southwest of Mount Shirley. Mapped by USGS from surveys and United States Navy aerial photographs, 1959-65. Named by US-ACAN for Lieutenant Commander Robert M. Booth, United States Navy, Public Works Officer during Operation Deep Freeze 1968 and 1969.

=== Mount Shirley ===
75°39′S 142°03′W. An ice-covered mountain whose east face is marked by a prominent cirque, surmounting the west side of the mouth of Land Glacier. Discovered by the USAS (1939-41) and named for Charles C. Shirley, chief photographer at the USAS West Base.

== Sources ==
- Alberts, Fred G., ed. (1995), Geographic Names of the Antarctic (PDF) (2 ed.), United States Board on Geographic Names This article incorporates public domain material from websites or documents of the United States Board on Geographic Names.
- Gutenko Nunataks, USGS: United States Geological Survey
- Mount McCoy, USGS: United States Geological Survey
- This article incorporates public domain material from websites or documents of the United States Geological Survey.
