= Mount Moulton =

Mountain in Antarctica

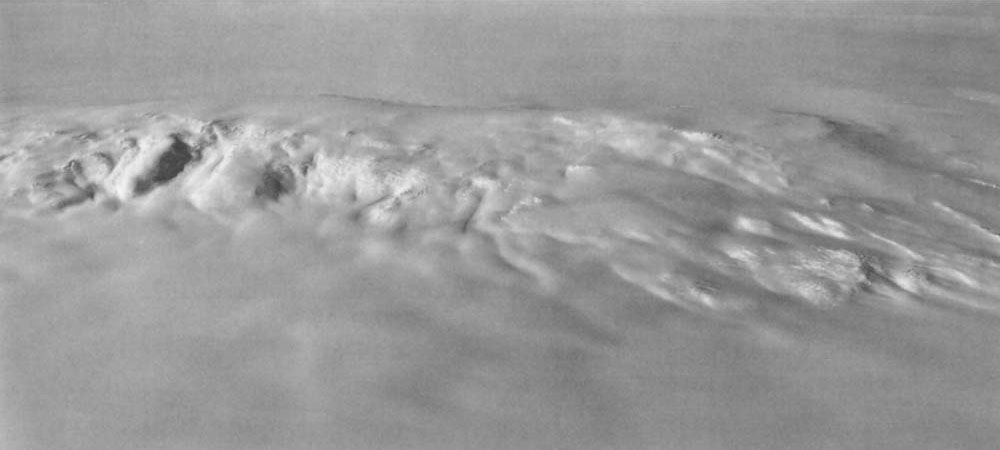
- Aerial view of Mount Moulton from the south

Highest point
- Elevation: 3,078 m (10,098 ft)
- Coordinates: 76°03′S 135°08′W

Geography
- Location within Antarctica
- Location: Marie Byrd Land, Antarctica
- Parent range: Flood Range

Geology
- Mountain type: Shield volcano
- Volcanic field: Marie Byrd Land Volcanic Province

Mount Moulton is a 40-kilometre-long (25 mi) complex of ice-covered shield volcanoes, standing 25 kilometres (16 mi) east of Mount Berlin in the Flood Range, Marie Byrd Land, Antarctica. It is named for Richard S. Moulton, chief dog driver at West Base. The volcano is of Pliocene age and is presently inactive.

The Prahl Crags are located on the southern slopes of Mount Moulton and are part of a caldera. There, an exposed area of blue ice can be found; this ice contains tephra layers from mainly neighbouring Mount Berlin volcano and some of the ice is almost half a million years old.

== Geology and geomorphology ==
Mount Moulton lies in Marie Byrd Land of Western Antarctica and in the region of the West Antarctic Ice Sheet. It is part of a system of volcanoes including Mount Berlin, Mount Takahe and Mount Waesche as well as of recently active subglacial volcanism. The volcano is named for Richard S. Moulton, chief dog driver of the United States Antarctic Service Expedition; the western end of the Flood Range where Mount Moulton lies was visited by this expedition in December 1940. Other field expeditions took place in 1967–1968, 1977–1978, 1993-1994 and 1999–2000.

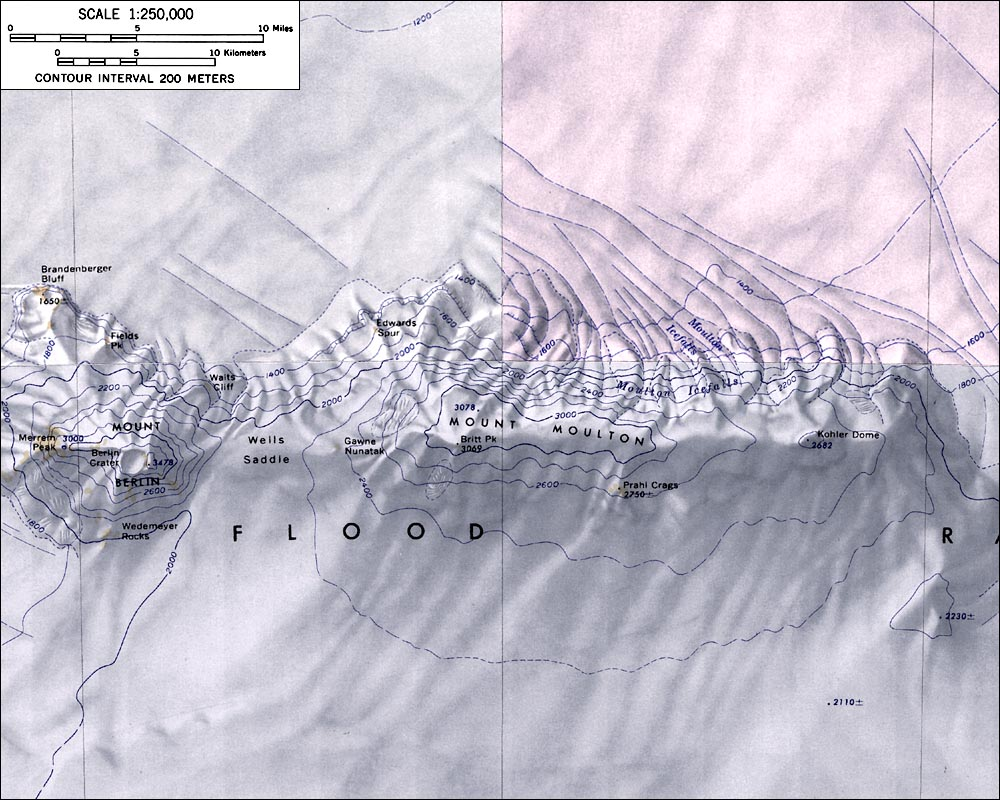
Topographic map of Mounts Moulton and Berlin

The volcano appears to be of Pliocene age and there is no evidence that it was glaciated during its eruptions. Only a few outcrops of Mount Moulton have been dated and these yield ages of 5.3 million years, with further age estimates of 4.9 – 4.7 million years ago, 5.9 million years ago and 1.04 ± 0.04 million years ago at Gawne Nunatak, which is a parasitic cone. There is no evidence of eruptive or thermal activity unlike at its neighbour Mount Berlin. Earthquakes have been recorded at Mount Moulton and are either of volcano-tectonic origin or due to the movement of ice along the flanks of the volcano.

The mountain is 3,078 metres (10,098 ft) high, rising about 1.7 kilometres (1.1 mi) above the ice surface on its northern flank, and located within the Flood Range; Mount Berlin lies across the c. 10 kilometres (6.2 mi) wide, high-elevation Wells Saddle 25 kilometres (16 mi) to the west and Kohler Dome is east of Moulton. Even farther east lie Mount Bursey, Mount Andrus, Mount Kosciuszko and Mount Kauffman, in the Ames Range. Mount Moulton is an obstacle to ice flow in the West Antarctic Ice Sheet, which has piled up on the mountain and is about 800 metres (2,600 ft) higher on the upstream side.

Mount Moulton is formed by a 40-kilometre-long (25 mi) complex of glaciated but largely uneroded shield volcanoes with two or possibly three ice-filled calderas, each of which is about 5–7 kilometres (3.1–4.3 mi) wide. The calderas are 8 kilometres (5.0 mi) apart and located at the Prahl Crags, Britt Peak and potentially Kohler Dome localities. Additionally the Prahl Crags – remnants of the former caldera rim – are found south, Gawne Nunatak west, Edwards Spur northeast and the Moulton Icefalls on the northern side of the mountain. The total volume of the complex is about 325 cubic kilometres (78 cu mi), comparable to that of Mount Shasta in the Cascade Range, and is one of the largest volcanoes in the Flood Range and Ames Range. Only the western part of the Mount Moulton emerges from the ice.

Volcanic rocks found at Mount Moulton include pantellerite, phonolite and trachyte; phenocryst phases found in the pantellerite include aenigmatite, anorthoclase, fayalite, hedenbergite, ilmenite and quartz.

== Blue ice field ==
A blue ice field has formed within the caldera of Mount Moulton behind the Prahl Crags, and contains ice almost 500,000 years old. It is the oldest dated ice in West Antarctica and much older than ice found elsewhere in West Antarctic ice cores. Such blue ice fields like those found at Mount Moulton form when glaciers run into an obstacle – in this case the Prahl Crags – and part of the ice starts moving vertically as it undergoes ablation processes like sublimation. In the case of Mount Moulton, this outcrop of ice is about 600 metres (2,000 ft) long. The ice has been used to reconstruct past climate states in West Antarctica, including the beginning and end of the last interglacial, and shows evidence that the West Antarctic Ice Sheet collapsed during that interglacial.

In addition, recognizable tephra layers are found in this ice and appear to originate from explosive eruptions of volcanoes such as Mount Berlin, Mount Takahe and Mount Waesche, although some may come from parasitic vents of Mount Berlin and Mount Moulton. These tephra layers at Mount Moulton crop out in parallel layers and geochemical traits indicate an origin at Mount Berlin although some layers may have been erupted from mafic volcanoes at Mount Moulton and Mount Berlin. Furthermore, the appearance of the deposits indicates that the eruptions of Mount Berlin were highly explosive. Most likely they eventually fell onto the ice of Mount Moulton, were incorporated in it and then transported downward to the blue ice field.

== See also ==
- List of volcanoes in Antarctica
