= Dunbar Head =

Dunbar Head (78°38′S 164°10′E) is a projecting rock headland at the south end of the Scott Coast, 11 nautical miles (20 km; 13 mi) southeast of the summit of Mount Morning. The feature rises to over 200 metres (660 ft) and overlooks the Ross Ice Shelf midway between Eastface Nunatak and Birthday Bluffs. It was named by the Advisory Committee on Antarctic Names (1999) after Nelia W. Dunbar, Department of Geoscience, New Mexico Institute of Mining and Technology, Socorro, who made geological investigations at nearby Mount Erebus, the Allan Hills, Mount Takahe, and the Crary Mountains.

== Features ==
- Eastface Nunatak
- Birthday Bluffs
