= Bursey =

Bursey is a surname. Notable people with the surname include:

- Jack Bursey (1903–1980), polar explorer and U.S. Coast Guard officer
- Morley Byron Bursey (1912–2013), Canadian diplomat

== See also ==
- Cathy Bursey-Sabourin, Fraser Herald at the Canadian Heraldic Authority in Ottawa, Canada
- Mount Bursey, a mountain in Antarctica
- Bursey Icefalls, the icefalls off Mount Bursey
