= Jack Bursey =

Canadian/American polar explorer (1903–1980)

Jacob Bursey

Personal details
- Born: September 20, 1903 St. Lunaire, Newfoundland Colony
- Died: March 1, 1980 (aged 76) Montague, Michigan
- Spouse: Ada DeGraff

Military service
- Branch/service: United States Coast Guard
- Rank: Commander

Commander Jacob "Jack" Bursey (1903–1980) was a Canadian polar explorer, a U.S. Coast Guard officer, and a lecturer.

== Early years ==
Bursey was born in 1903 in a small village called St. Lunaire in Newfoundland. He grew up fishing on the Grand Banks from his father's schooner, driving dog teams across the frozen land and bay, and skinning seals for food and clothing. He had two brothers and three sisters. His family worked six days a week, gardening in the rocky soil and fishing in the summer, and mending nets, dog sledding, and catching seals in the winter. Bursey's family was a little better off than his cousins, aunts, and uncles because of their schooner and family-owned store, where the town's other residents traded. They also bought and sold all the fish in the village.

With assistance from a doctor in St. Anthony, Bursey left home at 21 and enrolled at a Boston institute in the United States.

== First Byrd expedition ==
In 1927, Bursey read in a newspaper that Commander Richard E. Byrd was planning an expedition to the Antarctic and needed dog drivers and skiers. Bursey was one of 50,000 American males to apply. Though he was not initially selected, he brought a letter of recommendation from his employer to the expedition office and appealed to one of Byrd's men. The expedition was scheduled to depart in less than two weeks. Two days later, Bursey was granted a short interview with Byrd. In a later (1979) interview, Bursey remarked that he was disappointed when he first met Byrd, having pictured him as a "7-foot giant with fire in his eyes," but said that he found him both humble and friendly. Byrd told him that all his men were hired but that he would see what he could do.

Luck and experience were with Bursey. He was signed on as a seaman on the barque SS City of New York, one of two ships Byrd was taking on the expedition to the Bay of Whales, Antarctica. The City of New York, a sailing vessel, was probably one of the last of her kind in the world. Built of wood in Norway in 1882 for the Greenland sealing trade, with sides 34 inches (86 cm) thick, she was made to withstand much of the pressure of shifting ice. Roald Amundsen, as a young man, had sailed on her during one of her first voyages. Byrd's other ship was the Eleanor Bolling, a steam vessel. On board were the deconstructed parts from a Ford Trimotor airplane, the Floyd Bennett, which, when assembled, was intended to carry Byrd over the South Pole.

Bursey was on the barque when it left New York on August 25, traveling through the Panama Canal and across the Pacific Ocean, reaching New Zealand in 91 days. The Bolling, a faster ship, left a month later. With the Antarctic spring approaching, the two ships left New Zealand on December 2 for the final 1,200-mile (1,900 km) journey to the frozen continent. The Bolling took the City of New York in tow to save coal.

Seven days out we ran into a gale in the Antarctic ocean. We had that wire cable attached to the Bolling by way of a bridle. The ship was rolling heavily and taking seas over her sides, for she was heavily loaded. She was so deep in the water that one sailor of some distinction said she would never reach the Bay of Whales. We had only the foresail and the two lower topsails set on the fore and main masts to help out the Bolling, but were gradually running up on her as the wind was fair and we were making good time. The order was given to clew down (haul) the lower topsails. One of the ordinary seamen who knew little about sailing ships ran and released the lines before the sail was clewed and the sail tore in two. Just then the towline snapped and there were some harsh words.

According to Bursey, the C. A. Larsen, a whaler that worked the area every summer, met the City of New York and towed it through the pack ice while the Bolling returned to New Zealand for more supplies. It took seven days for Bursey and the rest of the crew to force their way through 200 miles of Antarctic pack ice and break through into the Ross Sea.

On Christmas Day, the Great Ice Barrier was sighted, and two days later, the City of New York was tied to ice in the Bay of Whales. A base camp, Little America, was set up 10 miles (16 km) away. Each day, the dog teams hauled the supplies to the camp. After the Bolling arrived from New Zealand with more cargo, the bay ice became unsafe, and the two ships were tied up to the towering ice barrier. On one trip to camp with supplies, Bursey heard the ships' whistles blowing in the alarm. The ice barrier had suddenly cracked, plunging tons of ice on the decks, partly capsizing the Bolling and throwing one man into the water.

"This all but ended the expedition right there," Bursey remembered. "The success of this million-dollar expedition depended on the polar flight. The fuselage of the Ford plane had landed on top of the barrier, but the wings were floating on large pieces of ice by the ships. Through the quick action of the crew, everything was rescued." The men worked hard in the weeks ahead, and before the sun went down and the long winter night set in, the camp was ready. In his diary, Bursey wrote, "The temperature has dropped to 172 degrees below, our record for the year so far."

Finally, on August 20, 1929, he wrote: "Today is the day of the beautiful morning... we saw the sun for the first time since April 19."

Bursey and several others traveled into the heartland by dog team on two missions. One was to mark a safe trail and leave caches of supplies over the 200 miles of treacherous crevasses and open chasms between the main base and the Queen Maud mountain range, where the geological party would make camp and conduct their studies. The other was to provide ground support for Byrd by erecting beacons every 50 miles and depositing emergency supplies at them in case Byrd’s plane crashed when he attempted to fly over the pole. Bursey's lead dog, St. Lunaire, blazed the trail. Byrd sent them off with, "Boys I would rather never fly over the South Pole than to lose one of you. Always take the course of safety; your lives are precious to me."

They reached the South Pole on November 29, 1929. Bursey described it:

The day before Bill Haynes the weatherman came into the mess hall all out of breath looking for the commander. "This is your day Commander. The best day of the whole year! To the north over the Ross Sea the sky is dark, but to the south it is beautiful and clear. The farther south you go, the clearer it will be." The whole camp came to life. The mechanics made their last checks. The oil had to be heated to boiling before it was poured into the engines. The tanks had to be topped off with gas. The plane had to be loaded with all the equipment: the aerial camera for Capt. Ashley McKinley, the photographer, and the navigation instruments and the radio gear. Bernt Balchen, the pilot, was sitting in the cockpit warming up the engines. Copilot and radio man Harold June was busy testing the radio. Commander Byrd was the last man to climb into the plane. It taxied to the end of the field and turned for the takeoff. Every man in camp stood silent, watching. When she finally took off, we all let out a roar. It was 3;29 p.m. The plane had 1,600 miles to go to the pole. The men left behind gathered in the radio shack to listen to the sounds of the engines over the loudspeaker. The temperature was 15 degrees above zero. Finally, at 1:32 a.m. June's voice relayed this message from Byrd: "My calculations indicate that we have reached the vicinity of the South Pole." The camp went wild with joy. The expedition was a success. It was 18 hours and 39 minutes from when the plane left until it returned. Then the celebration started. We were a happy lot.

But the danger was not yet over. Early in 1930, the City of New York was to return to the Antarctic to bring home the 42 men who had wintered at Little America. It was the worst spring ice in memory, and the whaling vessels that usually went through the pack in December were unable to get through without damage. Into this mass of roaring ice, the gallant City of New York hurled herself, forcing a way through. But there came the day when the ship labored, groaning under 200 tons of ice, the deck nearly awash. It was decided that if the Great Ice Barrier was not sighted in a few hours, the ship must turn north or sink. If the ship could not make it, there was no way to rescue these men until the ice thawed. There would be no long-range aircraft manufactured for many years.

According to Russell Owen, a special correspondent for the New York Times who was on board, "As the men were ready to drop from weariness, the clouds opened, and ahead of them was the magnificent peak of Mount Erebus, the living volcano of the Antarctic."

When the men returned to New York, they were greeted by Mayor Jimmy Walker, who led them on a ticker tape parade. Bursey and his mates each received a medal, authorized by a special act of Congress. It is inscribed: "Presented to the officers and men of the Byrd Antarctic Expedition l [for] their heroic and undaunted service in connection with scientific investigations and extraordinary aerial exploration of the Antarctic Continent."

Bursey missed Byrd's second Antarctic expedition in the early 1930s. While conducting tours of the City of New York at the Chicago World's Fair, he met and subsequently married Ada DeGraff of Grand Rapids, Michigan, one of the first women to fly in west Michigan. They had one daughter, Gloria.

The SS City of New York sank on a rocky shoal at Yarmouth, Nova Scotia, in 1962.

== Third Byrd expedition ==
Bursey went on to accompany Byrd on his third Antarctic expedition in 1939–1941, during which he and two other men made one of the longest dog-team trips ever recorded. They sledged into Marie Byrd Land over the Ross Ice Shelf, becoming the first known men to step on this land, traveling more than 1,200 miles (1,900 km) in 83 days. Today, there are mountains in the Hal Flood Range named after them: Mount Bursey (76°05′S 133°35′W), Mount Moulton, and Mount Berlin. Once again, each of the men on the expedition received a special Congressional medal.

During World War II, Bursey joined the U.S. Coast Guard and was captain of a freight and supply ship in the Philippines. In 1955, by then a lieutenant commander, Bursey was assigned to Operation Deep Freeze for the International Geophysical Year. In this expedition, he led a party of Seabees a distance of 996 miles (1,603 km) toward Byrd Station at latitude 80 degrees south, traveling in two vehicle-type Sno-Cats and one tractor-type Weasel. But for the first time, the deadly crevasses defeated Bursey and his party. Unable to get through, he was ordered back to the base. On the way home in 1957, Bursey received word that Admiral Byrd had died.

== Other activities ==
Between the later expeditions and for years afterward, Bursey lectured across the U.S. and at schools, often showing original 16mm films taken during the expeditions.

Bursey is the author of two books:

- Antarctic Night (Chicago: Rand McNally, 1957)
- St Lunaire, Antarctic Lead Dog (Glory Publishing Co, 1974)
