= Mount Takahe =

Shield volcano in Antarctica

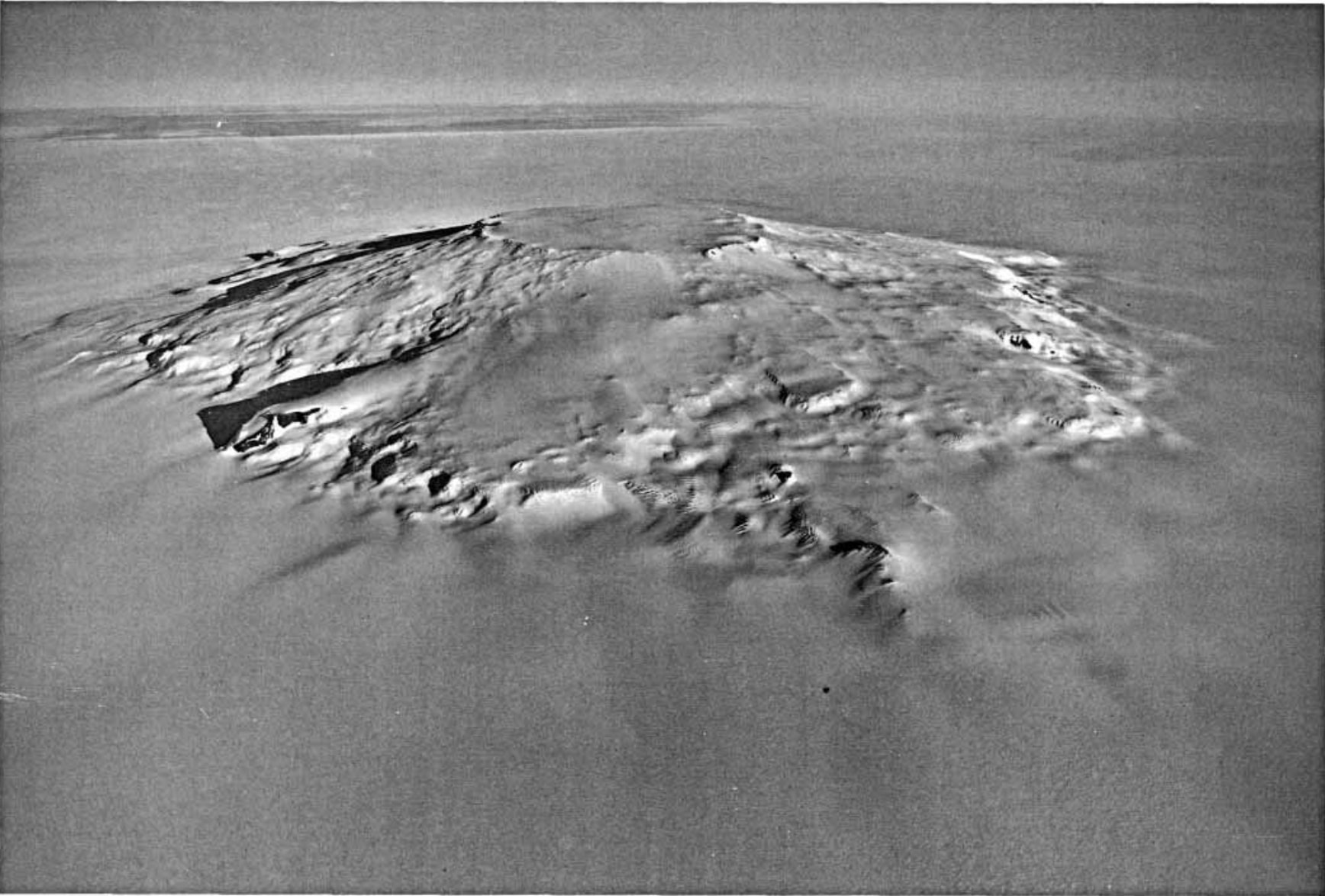
- Aerial view looking east. The prominent ridge at the center-left with the shadow behind is Gill Bluff.

Highest point
- Elevation: 3,460 m (11,350 ft)
- Prominence
- Listing: Volcanoes in Antarctica
- Coordinates: 76°17′S 112°05′W

Geography
- Location within Antarctica
- Continent: Antarctica
- Region: Marie Byrd Land

Geology
- Mountain type: Shield volcano
- Volcanic field: Marie Byrd Land Volcanic Province
- Last eruption: 5550 BC (?)

Mount Takahe is a 3,460-metre-high (11,350 ft) snow-covered shield volcano in Marie Byrd Land, Antarctica, 200 kilometres (120 mi) from the Amundsen Sea. It is a c. 30-kilometre-wide (19 mi) mountain with parasitic vents and a caldera up to 8 kilometres (5 mi) wide. Most of the volcano is formed by trachytic lava flows, but hyaloclastite is also found. Snow, ice, and glaciers cover most of Mount Takahe. With a volume of 780 km^{3} (200 mi^{3}), it is a massive volcano; the parts of the edifice that are buried underneath the West Antarctic Ice Sheet are probably even larger. It is part of the West Antarctic Rift System along with 18 other known volcanoes.

The volcano was active in the Quaternary period. (Note: From 2.58 million years ago to present.) Radiometric dating has yielded ages of up to 300,000 years for its rocks, and it reached its present height about 200,000 years ago. Several tephra layers encountered in ice cores at Mount Waesche and Byrd Station have been attributed to Mount Takahe, although some of them were later linked to eruptions of Mount Berlin instead. The tephra layers were formed by explosive or phreatomagmatic eruptions. Major eruptions took place around 17,700 years ago—possibly forming an ozone hole over Antarctica—and in the early Holocene. (Note: The Holocene began 11,700 years ago and continues to the present day.) Mount Takahe's last eruption occurred about 7,600 years ago, and there is no present-day activity.

== Geography and geomorphology ==
The mountain's name refers to the takahē, a flightless and nearly extinct bird from New Zealand; members of the 1957–1958 Marie Byrd Land Traverse party nicknamed an aircraft that had resupplied them "takahe". It was first visited in 1957–1958 and again in 1968, 1984–1985 and 1998–1999. A seismic station was installed on Mount Takahe before January 2019.

Mount Takahe is at the Bakutis Coast, eastern Marie Byrd Land, Antarctica. Bear Peninsula and the Amundsen Sea coast are 200 kilometres (120 mi) north of Mount Takahe. It is an isolated mountain, and the closest other volcanoes are Mount Murphy 100 kilometres (62 mi) and Toney Mountain 140 kilometres (87 mi) away. No major air routes or supply roads to Antarctic stations pass close to the mountain, and some parts of the cone are accessible only by helicopter.

The volcanic mountain rises 2,100 metres (6,900 ft) above the ice level with maximum elevation 3,460 metres (11,350 ft). (Note: Alternative heights of 3,398 metres (11,148 ft) or 3,390 metres (11,120 ft) have also been reported. The initial measurements and airborne measurements of Mount Takahe's height have discrepancies of as much as 103 metres (338 ft).) It is an undissected nearly perfect cone, a 30-kilometre-wide (19 mi) shield volcano with an exposed volume of about 780 cubic kilometres (190 cu mi). The subglacial part, which might bottom out at 1,340–2,030 metres (4,400–6,660 ft) below sea level, could have an even larger volume and is elongated in an east–west direction. On its summit lies a flat, snow-filled 8-kilometre-wide (5 mi) caldera with a 10-metre-wide (33 ft) and 15-metre-high (50 ft) volcanic neck. A lava dome may crop out inside the caldera. Radial fissure vents are found around the volcano, and vents also occur around the caldera rim. There are at least three parasitic vents with basaltic composition on its lower flanks, with three cinder cones found on the western and southern slopes. One of these cinder cones has been described as a subdued 100-metre-wide (330 ft) vent. The Jaron Cliffs are found on the southern slope.

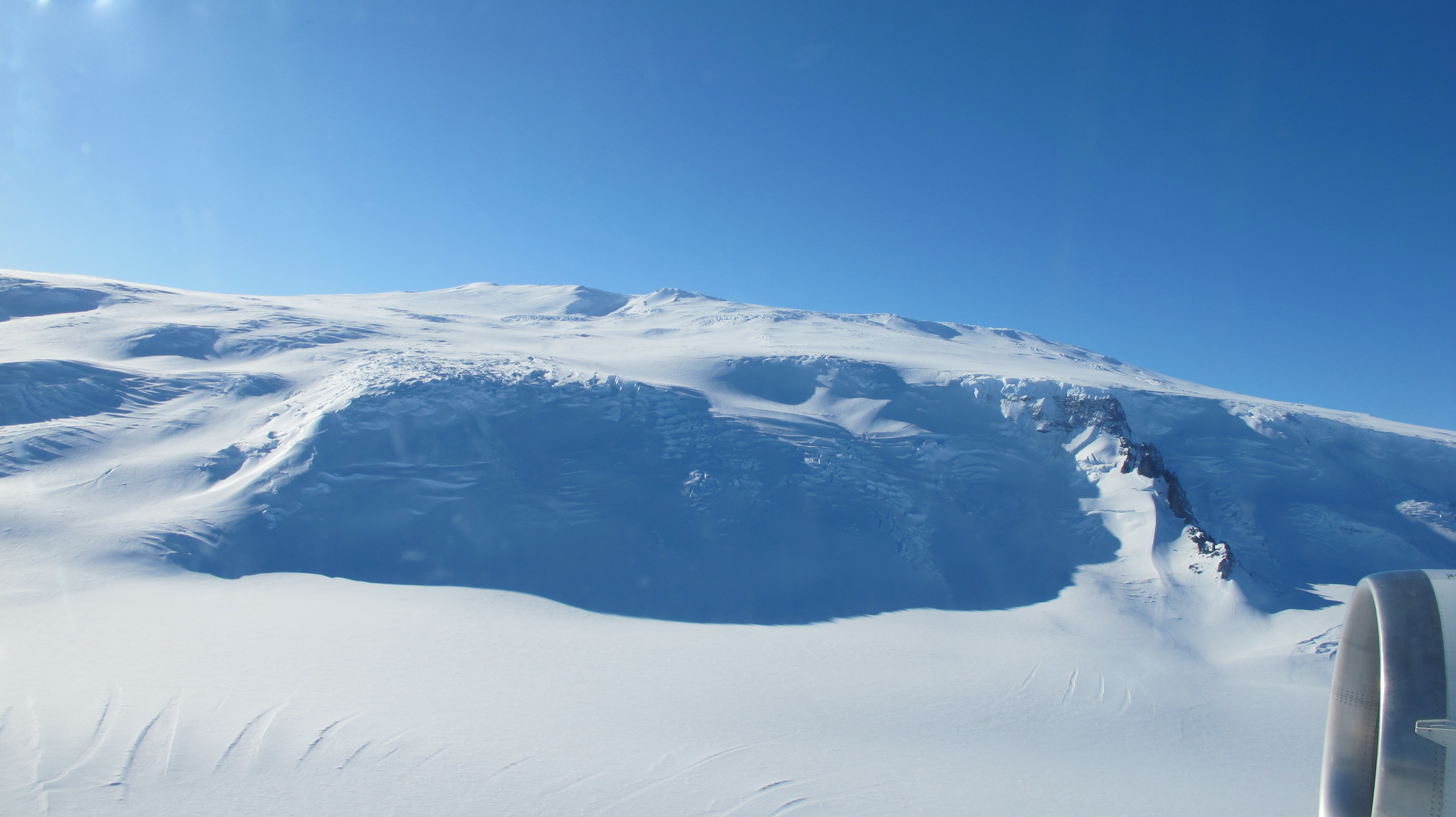
Cliffs on the lower part of the volcano

The volcano is largely uneroded, mostly hiding the internal structure which would clarify its history.Only twelve outcrops, (Note: The outcrops include Knezevich Rock on the northern foot, Stauffer Bluff on the north-northeastern foot, Oeschger Bluff on the southeastern foot, Möll Spur on the southern foot, Bucher Rim on the south-southwestern caldera rim, at Steur Glacier on the southern flank, Cadenazzi Rock on the western flank, Roper Point at the west-southwest foot and Gill Bluff on the northwestern foot. The latter (76°14′S 112°33′W) is a rock bluff on the northwest side of Mount Takahe, in Marie Byrd Land. It was mapped by the United States Geological Survey (USGS) from ground surveys and U.S. Navy air photos (1959–1966) and was named by the Advisory Committee on Antarctic Names (US-ACAN) for Allan Gill, aurora researcher at Byrd Station in 1963.) with a total area of less than 0.5 square kilometres (0.19 sq mi), emerge from the ice. Based on these outcrops, lava flows with a thickness of 2–10 metres (6 ft 7 in – 32 ft 10 in) appear to be widespread on Mount Takahe, while pyroclastic rocks such as deposits of Strombolian eruptions, lapilli tuffs and lahar deposits are less common. Occurrences of pyroclastic rocks at the summit have been correlated with tephra deposits elsewhere in Antarctica. Additionally, obsidian-bearing and recently erupted lava bomb-and-block units crop out in the caldera rim, at Bucher Rim. Tuyas have been reported.

=== Glaciation ===
Mount Takahe is almost entirely covered by ice of the West Antarctic Ice Sheet, which rises about 1,300 metres (4,300 ft) above sea level. A tributary of the Thwaites Glacier passes close by. There are two small glaciers on the volcano itself, on the southwestern and northern flanks. They are eroding eruption products from the summit area, and moraines have been mapped both on the western flank and in the summit caldera. Glacial erosion is slight, with only a few corries cut into the lower slopes. The ice cover on the mountain includes both snow-covered and ice-covered areas, with sastrugi and other wind-roughened surfaces. The cold dry polar environment retards weathering. Air temperatures are usually below freezing.

Some rock units at the foot of the volcano were emplaced underneath ice or water and feature hyaloclastite and pillow lavas. These units rise to about 350–400 metres (1,150–1,310 ft) above the present-day ice level. Some of these units, such as Gill Bluff, Möll Spur and Stauffer Bluff, are "hydrovolcanic deltas" comparable to lava deltas which formed when lava flows or parasitic vents entered the ice, generating meltwater lakes around them. They crop out at the base of the volcano and are well preserved. Ice elevation was not stable during the emplacement of these deltas, and meltwater drained away, leading to the formation of diverse structures within the hyaloclastite deltas. The deltas may have formed during ice highstands 66,000 and 22,000–15,000 years ago. Future climate change might lower the ice surface by 0.5–1 kilometre (0.31–0.62 mi) in the next few centuries, which could impact volcanic activity.

== Geology ==
The West Antarctic Rift System is a basin and range province similar to the Great Basin in North America; it cuts across Antarctica from the Ross Sea to the Bellingshausen Sea. The Rift became active during the Mesozoic. (Note: Between 251.902 ± 0.024 and 66 million years ago.) Owing to thick ice cover it is not clear whether it is currently active, and there is no seismic activity. Most of the Rift lies below sea level. To the south it is flanked by the Transantarctic Mountains and to the north by the volcanic province of Marie Byrd Land. Volcanic activity in Marie Byrd Land commenced about 34 million years ago, but high activity began 14 million years ago. A major uplifted dome, 1,200 by 500 kilometres (750 mi × 310 mi) in width, is centred on the Amundsen Sea coast and is associated with the Rift.

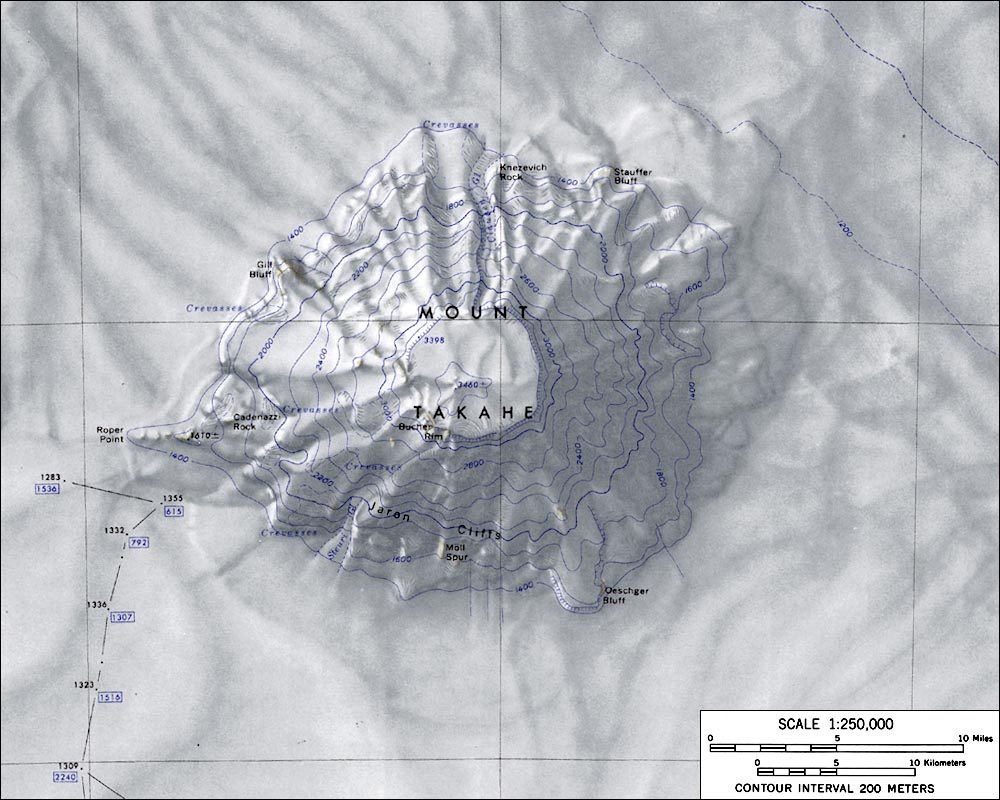
Topographic map of Mount Takahe

About 18 central volcanoes were active in Marie Byrd Land from the Miocene (Note: From 23.03 million years ago to 5.333 million years ago.) to the Holocene. Among the volcanic areas in Marie Byrd Land are the Flood Range with Mount Berlin, the Ames Range, the Executive Committee Range with Mount Sidley and Mount Waesche, the Crary Mountains, Toney Mountain, Mount Takahe and Mount Murphy. These volcanoes mainly occur in groups or chains, but there also are isolated edifices. Mount Takahe is located in the eastern Marie Byrd Land volcanic province and with an estimated volume of 5,520 cubic kilometres (1,320 cu mi) (Note: Of which 780 cubic kilometres (190 cu mi) risee above the surrounding ice.) could be the largest of the Marie Byrd Land volcanoes, comparable to Mount Kilimanjaro in Africa.

Most of these volcanoes are large, capped off by a summit caldera and appear to have begun as fast-growing shield volcanoes. Later, calderas formed. Eventually, late in the history of the volcanoes parasitic vents were active. The volcanoes are all surmounted by rocks composed of trachyte, phonolite, pantellerite, or comendite. Their activity has been attributed either to the reactivation of crustal structures or to the presence of a mantle plume. The volcanoes rise from a basement dating to the Paleozoic.

Mount Takahe may feature a large magma chamber and a heat flow anomaly has been found. A magnetic anomaly has also been linked to the mountain.

=== Composition ===
Trachyte is the most common rock on Mount Takahe, phonolite being less common. Basanite, hawaiite, and mugearite are uncommon, but the occurrence of benmoreite and pantellerite has been reported, and some rocks have been classified as andesites. Hawaiite occurs exclusively in the older outcrops, basanite only in parasitic vents and mugearite only on the lower sector of the volcano. Despite this, most of the volcano is believed to consist of mafic rocks with only about 10–15% of felsic rocks, as the upper visible portion of the volcano could be resting on a much larger buried base. The parasitic vents probably make up less than 1% of the edifice. Ice-lava interactions produced hyaloclastite, palagonite and sideromelane. No major changes in magma chemistry occurred during the last 40,000 years but some variation has been recorded.

All these rocks appear to have a common origin and define an alkaline–peralkaline suite. Phenocrysts include mainly plagioclase, with less common olivine and titanomagnetite; apatite has been reported as well. The magmas appear to have formed through fractional crystallization at varying pressures, and ultimately came from the lithosphere at 80–90-kilometre (50–56 mi) depth, that was affected by subduction processes over 85 million years ago.

== Eruption history ==
The volcano was active in the late Quaternary. Radiometric results reported in 1988 include ages of less than 360,000 years for rocks in the caldera rim and of less than 240,000 years for volcanic rocks on the flanks. In his 1990 book Volcanoes of the Antarctic Plate and Southern Oceans LeMasurier gave 310,000±90,000 years ago as the oldest date for samples tested, citing unpublished K-Ar dates, but in a 2016 review of dates for Mount Takahe LeMasurier reported that none were older than 192,000 years. A 2013 paper also by LeMasurier reported maximum ages of 192,000 years for caldera rim rocks and of 66,000 years for lower flank rocks. The entire volcano may have formed in less than 400,000 years or even less than 200,000 years, which would imply rapid growth of the edifice. Rocks aged 192,000±6,300 years old are found at the summit caldera, implying that the volcano had reached its present-day height by then.

Early research indicated that most of Mount Takahe formed underneath the ice, but more detailed field studies concluded that most of the volcano developed above the ice surface. The ice surface has fluctuated over the life of Mount Takahe with an increased thickness during marine isotope stages 4 and 2, explaining why units originally emplaced under ice or water now lie above the ice surface and alternate with lava flow deposits. These elevated deposits were emplaced about 29,000–12,000 years ago while the lava delta-like deposits are between about 70,000 and 15,000 years old. After it grew out of the ice, Mount Takahe increased in size through the emission of lava flows with occasional pyroclastic eruptions. Outcrops in the summit region indicate that most eruptions were magmatic, but some hydromagmatic activity occurred. Cinder cones and tuff cones formed during the late stage of activity.

=== Tephra in ice cores ===
Tephra layers in ice cores drilled at Byrd Station have been attributed to Mount Takahe. The volcano reaches an altitude high enough that tephras erupted from it can readily penetrate the tropopause and spread over Antarctica through the stratosphere. The occurrence of several volcanic eruptions in the region about 30,000 years ago has been suggested to have caused a cooling of the climate of Antarctica, but it is also possible that the growth of the ice sheets at that time squeezed magma chambers at Mount Takahe and thus induced an increase of the eruptive activity.

Assuming that most tephra layers at Byrd come from Mount Takahe, it has been inferred that the volcano was very active between 60,000 and 7,500 years ago, with nine eruptive periods and two pulses between 60,000 and 57,000 and 40,000–14,000 years ago. In the latter part of the latter period hydrovolcanic eruptions became dominant at Mount Takahe, with a maximum around the time when the Wisconsin glaciation ended. It is possible that between 18,000 and 15,000 years ago, either a crater lake formed in the caldera or the vents were buried by snow and ice. The caldera itself might have formed between 20,000 and 15,000 years ago, probably not through a large explosive eruption.

It cannot be entirely ruled out that Byrd Station tephras originate at other volcanoes of Marie Byrd Land such as Mount Berlin. In particular, tephra layers between 30,000 and 20,000 years ago have been attributed to the latter volcano.

Tephra layers from Mount Takahe have also been found at Dome C, Dome F, Mount Takahe itself, Mount Waesche, Siple Dome (Note: A tephra layer emplaced at Siple Dome 19,700 years ago has been correlated to eruptions at Takahe.) and elsewhere in Antarctica. Apart from ice cores, tephras attributed to Mount Takahe have been found in sediment cores taken from the sea. The tephra layers have been used to date ice cores. Volcanic eruptions at Mount Takahe lack the pyroclastic flow deposits observed in other large explosive eruptions. The thickness of the Byrd ice core tephras attributed to Mount Takahe suggested that the eruptions were not large, but later research has indicated that large Plinian eruptions also occurred.

A series of eruptions about 200 years long took place at Mount Takahe 17,700 years ago. These eruptions have been recorded from ice cores at the WAIS Divide and at Taylor Glacier in the McMurdo Dry Valleys, where they constrain estimates of the rate of deglaciation. These eruptions released a large quantity of halogens into the stratosphere, which together with the cold and dry climate conditions of the Last Glacial Maximum would presumably have led to massive ozone destruction and the formation of an ozone hole. Bromine and sulfur isotope data indicate that the amount of UV radiation in the atmosphere did increase at that time in Antarctica. As is the case with the present-day ozone hole, the ozone hole created by the Takahe eruptions might have altered the Antarctic climate and sped up deglaciation, which was accelerating at that time, but later research has determined that the warming was most likely not volcanically forced.

=== Holocene and recent activity ===
Activity waned after this point, two hydromagmatic eruptions being recorded 13,000 and 9,000 years ago and a magmatic eruption 7,500 years ago. This last eruption is also known from the Byrd ice core and may correspond to an eruption 8,200±5,400 years ago recorded at Mount Waesche and the Takahe edifice and to two 6217 and 6231 BC tephra layers at Siple Dome. Tephra from a 8,200 before present eruption has been recorded at Siple Dome and Mount Waesche. A 7,900 before present eruption at Mount Takahe is one of the strongest eruptions at Siple Dome and Byrd Station of the last 10,000 years. Another eruption reported by the Global Volcanism Program may have occurred in 7050 BC. At Siple Dome, a further eruption between 10,700 and 5,600 years ago is recorded and one tephra layer around 1783 BC (accompanied by increased sulfate concentrations in ice) might also come from Mount Takahe. Glass shards at Law Dome emplaced in 1552 and 1623 AD may come from this volcano as well.

The Global Volcanism Program reports 5550 BC as the date of the last known eruption, and the volcano is currently considered dormant. There is no evidence of fumarolic activity or warm ground, unlike at Mount Berlin, which is the other young volcano of Marie Byrd Land. Seismic activity recorded at 9–19 kilometres (5.6–11.8 mi) depth around the volcano has been attributed to activity in the shallow magmatic system. Mount Takahe has been prospected for the possibility of obtaining geothermal energy.

== Named features ==
Named features of the mountain, clockwise from the north, include Clausen Glacier, Knezevich Rock, Stauffer Bluff, Oeschger Bluff, Bucher Rim, Jaron Cliffs, Möll Spur, Steuri Glacier, Cadenazzi Rock, Roper Point and Gill Bluff.

Feature	Coordinates	Description
Clausen Glacier	76°10′S 112°03′W	A narrow glacier draining northward from the summit of Mount Takahe. The terminus of the glacier is just west of Knezevich Rock. It was mapped by the United States Geological Survey (USGS) from surveys and United States Navy aerial photographs, 1959–66. It was named by the United States Advisory Committee on Antarctic Names (US-ACAN) for Henrik B. Clausen (University of Bern, Switzerland), United States Antarctic Research Program (USARP) glaciologist at Byrd Station, 1969–70.
Knezevich Rock	76°10′S 112°00′W.	A rock outcrop on the lower part of the north slope of Mount Takahe. It lies at the east side of the mouth of Clausen Glacier. It was mapped by the USGS from surveys and United States Navy aerial photography, 1959–66. It was named by the US-ACAN for Nick Knezevich Jr., United States Navy, electronics technician at South Pole Station, 1974.
Stauffer Bluff	76°10′S 111°46′W.	A rocky bluff at the northeast extremity of Mount Takahe. It was mapped by the USGS from surveys and United States Navy tricamera aerial photographs, 1959–66. It was named by the US-ACAN for Bernhard Stauffer (University of Bern, Switzerland), USARP glaciologist at Byrd Station, 1968–69 and 1969–70.
Oeschger Bluff	76°24′S 111°48′W.	A flat-topped snow and rock bluff that projects from the southeast part of Mount Takahe. It was mapped by the USGS from surveys and United States Navy tricamera aerial photography, 1959–66. It was named by the US-ACAN for Hans Oeschger (University of Bern, Switzerland), USARP glaciologist at Byrd Station, 1968–69 and 1969–70.
Bucher Rim	76°19′S 112°00′W	A rocky eminence on the south portion of the rim of the extinct volcano Mount Takahe. It was mapped by the USGS from surveys and United States Navy tricamera aerial photographs, 1959–66. It was named by the US-ACAN for Peter Bucher (University of Bern, Switzerland), USARP glaciologist at Byrd Station, 1969–70.
Jaron Cliffs	76°23′S 112°10′W.	A line of steep, snow-covered cliffs on the south side of Mount Takahe. It was mapped by the USGS from ground surveys and United States Navy air photographs, 1959–66. It was named by the US-ACAN for Helmut P. Jaron, aurora researcher at Byrd Station in 1963.
Möll Spur	76°23′S 112°09′W.	A jagged rock spur which juts southward from Jaron Cliffs on the southern slope of Mount Takahe. It was mapped by the USGS from surveys and United States Navy tricamera aerial photographs, 1959–66. It was named by the US-ACAN for Markus Moll (University of Bern, Switzerland), USARP glaciologist at Byrd Station, 1969–70.
Steuri Glacier	76°23′S 112°24′W.	A glacier descending the southern slopes of Mount Takahe. The feature is 3.5 nautical miles (6.5 km; 4.0 mi) west of Moll Spur. It was mapped by the USGS from surveys and United States Navy aerial photography, 1959–66. It was named by the US-ACAN for Heinrich Steuri (University of Bern, Switzerland), USARP glaciologist at Byrd Station, 1968–69.
Cadenazzi Rock	76°18′S 112°39′W.	A rock outcrop 1.5 nautical miles (2.8 km; 1.7 mi) east of Roper Point on the west slope of Mount Takahe. It was mapped by the USGS from surveys and United States Navy tricamera aerial photographs, 1959–66. It was named by the US-ACAN for Lieutenant Michael P. Cadenazzi, United States Navy, LH-34 helicopter commander. He flew close support missions for USARP scientists during the 1969–70 and 1970–71 seasons.
Roper Point	76°19′S 112°54′W.	A largely ice-covered point, but with some rock exposures, at the west extremity of Mount Takahe. It was mapped by the USGS from ground surveys and United States Navy air photographs, 1959–66. It was named by the US-ACAN for Nathaniel A. Roper, aurora researcher at Byrd Station in 1963.
Gill Bluff	76°14′S 112°33′W.	A rock bluff on the northwest side of Mount Takahe. It was mapped by the USGS from ground surveys and United States Navy air photographs, 1959–66. It was named by the US-ACAN for Allan Gill, aurora researcher at Byrd Station in 1963.

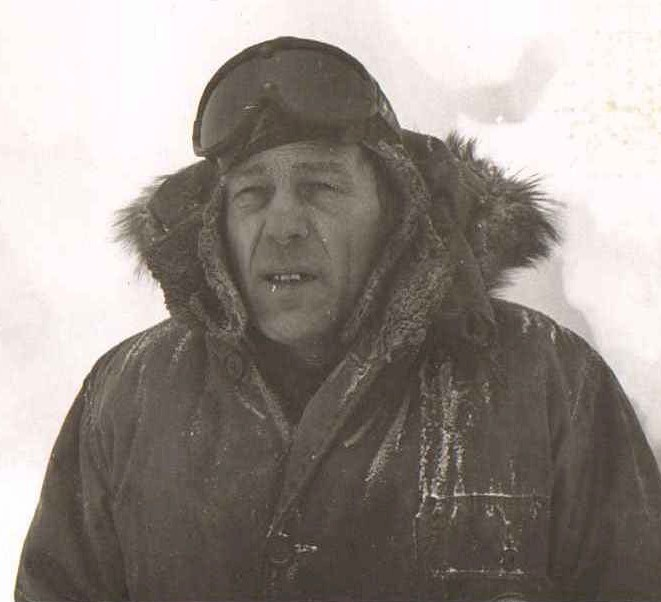
Helmut P. Jaron, for whom the Jaron Cliffs are named.

== See also ==
- List of ultras of Antarctica
