= Anniversary Bluff =

Anniversary Bluff (78°33′S 164°15′E) is a rock cliff 1.5 nautical miles (3 km) west of the Birthday Bluffs on the south side of Mason Spur, Hillary Coast, Ross Dependency. The bluff rises to about 1,300 metres (4,300 ft). The name was suggested by geologist Anne C. Wright, Department of Geoscience, New Mexico Institute of Mining and Technology, Socorro, whose field party visited the bluff on November 29, 1983, her parents' wedding anniversary.

== See also ==
- Ross Dependency
