= Windscoop =

Windscoop is the name of two geographical features in Antarctica:

- Windscoop Bluff, Ross Dependency
- Windscoop Nunataks, Graham Land
