= 76th parallel =

76th parallel may refer to:

- 76th parallel north, a circle of latitude in the Northern Hemisphere
- 76th parallel south, a circle of latitude in the Southern Hemisphere
- The 76th Parallel Escarpment, an escarpment in Antarctica, also known as the Usas Escarpment
