= Eastface Nunatak =

Nunatak in Ross Dependency, Antarctica

Eastface Nunatak (78°42′S 163°38′E) is a small nunatak about 11 nautical miles (20 km) south of Mount Morning on the Ross Dependency's Hillary Coast in Antarctica. It is ice covered with a conspicuous rock face on the east side. It was mapped by the United States Geological Survey from ground surveys and Navy air photos, and was given this descriptive name by the Advisory Committee on Antarctic Names in 1963.
