= Fumarolic ice tower =

Tower of ice produced by fumaroles of volcanic activity

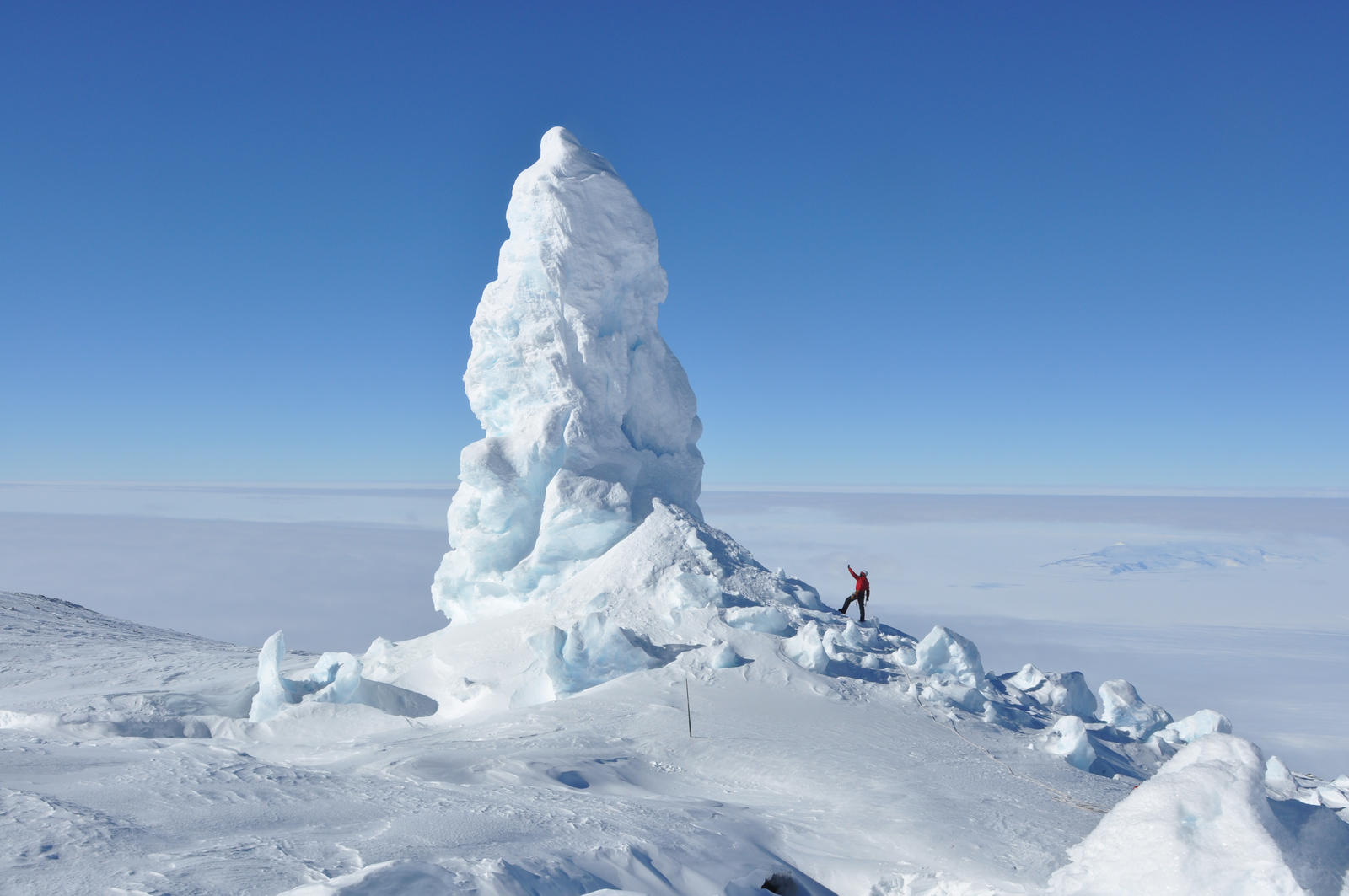
Fumarolic ice tower on Mount Erebus

A fumarolic ice tower is a tower of ice produced by fumaroles of volcanic activity in an environment whose ambient temperature is below the freezing point of water. They are often underlain by large ice caves.

Mount Erebus, the world's southernmost active volcano, is one producer of these ice towers. The ambient temperature at its location is always well below water's freezing point, and the diffuse degassing of carbon dioxide through the steaming warm ground around its flanks causes ice to first melt, then vaporize, and then accumulate into chimney-like towers.

Mount Berlin is another Antarctic volcanic mountain that produced such towers.
