= Prahl Crags =

Mountain in Antarctica

Prahl Crags (76°4′S 134°43′W) are a group of rock crags at an elevation of 2,750 m on the south slopes of the Mount Moulton massif, in Marie Byrd Land. Mapped by United States Geological Survey (USGS) from ground surveys and U.S. Navy air photos, 1959–66. Named by Advisory Committee on Antarctic Names (US-ACAN) for Sidney R. Prahl, a member of the United States Antarctic Research Program (USARP) team that studied ice sheet dynamics in the area northeast of Byrd Station, 1971–72.
