= Windscoop Bluff =

Rock bluff in Ross Dependency, Antarctica

Windscoop Bluff (78°32′S 164°28′E) is a rock bluff east-northeast of Birthday Bluffs on the south side of Mason Spur, Hillary Coast, Ross Dependency. The bluff rises to about 1000 m and is marked at the base by a large windscoop. The name was suggested by geologist Anne C. Wright, Department of Geoscience, New Mexico Institute of Mining and Technology, Socorro, who examined the bluff in 1983–84.
