= Mount Andrus =

Mountain in Marie Byrd Land, Antarctica

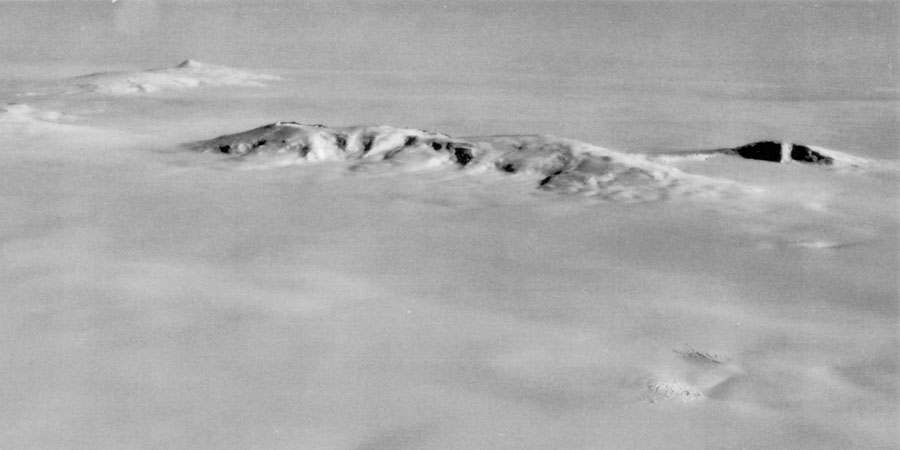
- Aerial view of the Ames Range. Mount Andrus is the first mount from the left, excluding Mount Berlin, which can be seen isolated far away

Highest point
- Elevation: 2,978 m (9,770 ft)
- Prominence: 1,114 m (3,655 ft)
- Listing: Ribu
- Coordinates: 75°48′0″S 132°18′0″W

Geography
- Location within Antarctica
- Location: Marie Byrd Land, Antarctica
- Parent range: Ames Range

Geology
- Rock age: middle Miocene - Holocene
- Mountain type: Shield volcano
- Volcanic field: Marie Byrd Land Volcanic Province

Mount Andrus (75°48′0″S 132°18′0″W) is a peak 2 nautical miles (3.7 km; 2.3 mi) southeast of Mount Boennighausen in the southeast extremity of the Ames Range, in Marie Byrd Land, Antarctica.

== Mapping and name ==
Mount Andrus was mapped by the United States Geological Survey (USGS) from surveys and United States Navy air photographs, 1964–68. It was named by the United States Advisory Committee on Antarctic Names (US-ACAN) for Lt. Carl H. Andrus, United States Navy, medical officer and Officer-in-Charge of Byrd Station in 1964.

== Geology ==
Mount Andrus is the youngest of the shield volcanoes in the Ames Range, which formed during the Miocene. Late-stage volcanic activity resumed at Mount Andrus in the late Pleistocene or the Holocene. It has a 4.5 kilometres (2.8 mi) wide caldera at its summit. While the age of Mt. Andrus is not well known it is one of the oldest trachytic shield volcanoes in Marie Byrd Land, similar in age to Mount Hampton. The westward face of the mountain is drained by the Coleman Glacier, with significant crevassing present.

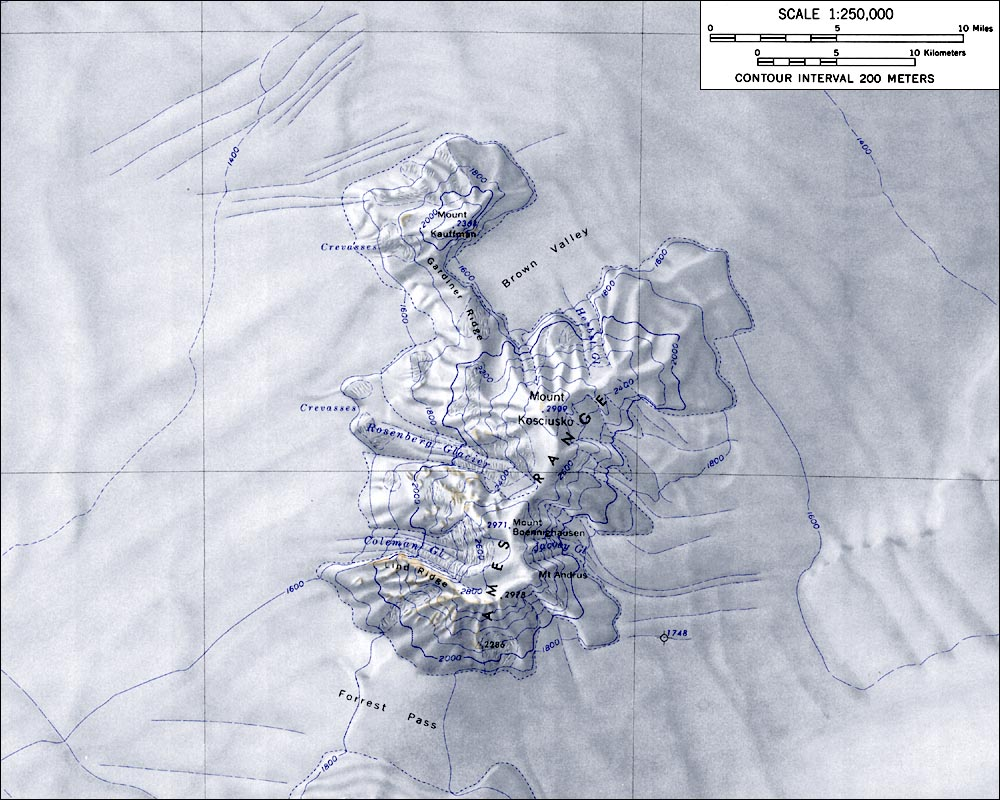
Topographic map of the Ames Range (1:250,000 scale) from USGS Mount Kosciusko

== Sources ==
- Alberts, Fred G., ed. (1995), Geographic Names of the Antarctic (PDF) (2 ed.), United States Board on Geographic Names This article incorporates public domain material from websites or documents of the United States Board on Geographic Names.
- Andrus, Smithsonian Institution
- Le Masurier, W. E.; Thomson, J.W., eds. (1990), "B. 12. Ames Range", Volcanoes of the Antarctic Plate and Southern Oceans, Antarctic Research Series vol 48, Washington, DC: American Geophysical Union, pp. 216–220, doi:10.1029/AR048, ISBN 9781118664728
