= Mount Kauffman =

Mountain in Marie Byrd Land, Antarctica

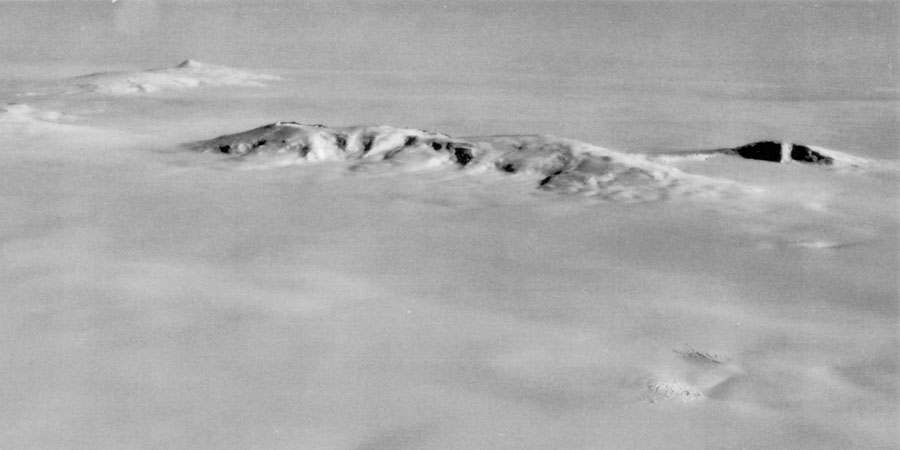
- Aerial view of the Ames Range, Mount Kauffman is the mount to the right at the end of the chain.

Highest point
- Elevation: 2,365 m (7,759 ft)
- Coordinates: 75°37′S 132°25′W

Geography
- Location within Antarctica
- Location: Marie Byrd Land, Antarctica
- Parent range: Ames Range

Geology
- Mountain type: Shield volcano
- Volcanic field: Marie Byrd Land Volcanic Province

Mount Kauffman is a prominent mountain, 2,365 metres (7,760 ft) high, that surmounts the northwest end of the Ames Range in Marie Byrd Land, Antarctica. It was mapped by the United States Geological Survey from surveys and U.S. Navy air photos, 1959–65, and named by the Advisory Committee on Antarctic Names for Commander S.K. Kauffman, U.S. Navy, a staff civil engineering officer who supervised the planning and building of Plateau Station, 1965–66.

It is connected to Mount Kosciusko by Gardiner Ridge which is at one end of Brown Valley.

Kauffman consists of a potentially active shield volcano with a 3 km (1.9 mi) wide summit caldera. Minor fumarolic activity was observed in 1977.

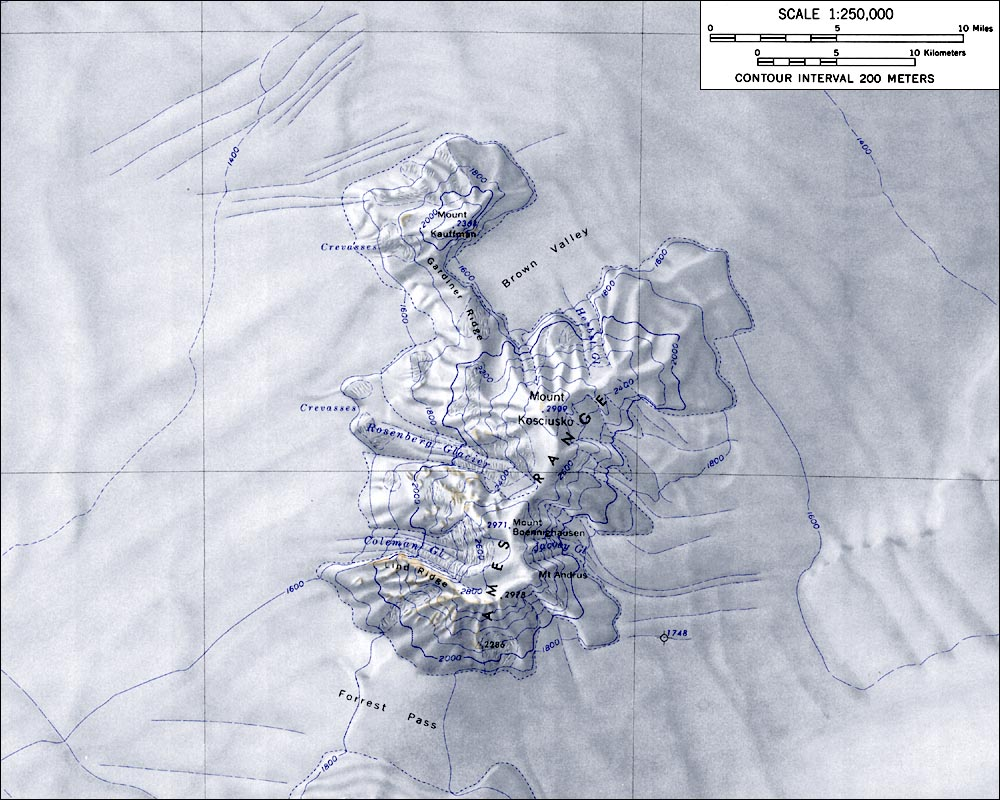
Topographic map of the Ames Range (1:250,000 scale) from USGS Mount Kosciusko
