= Birthday Bluffs =

Birthday Bluffs (78°33′S 164°22′E) are rock bluffs that rise to 1,296 metres (4,252 ft) between Anniversary Bluff and Windscoop Bluff on the south side of Mason Spur, Hillary Coast, Ross Dependency. The feature comprises a series of cliffs (caused by thick lava flows) that step up the escarpment. The name was suggested by geologist Anne C. Wright, Department of Geoscience, New Mexico Institute of Mining and Technology, Socorro, who examined the bluffs on November 21, 1983, the birthday of her father, Peter Wright.
