= Marie Byrd Land Volcanic Province =

Volcanic field in Antarctica

- Location within Antarctica

Highest point
- Peak: Mount Sidley
- Elevation: 4,181 m (13,717 ft)
- Coordinates: 77.04°S 126.10°W

Geography
- Region: Marie Byrd Land, West Antarctica

Geology
- Formed by: Shield volcanoes, subglacial volcanoes
- Rock age: Eocene-to-Holocene

The Marie Byrd Land Volcanic Province is a volcanic field in northern Marie Byrd Land of West Antarctica, consisting of over 18 large shield volcanoes, 30 small volcanic centres and possibly many more centres buried under the West Antarctic Ice Sheet. It overlies a 500 km (310 mi) wide and 800 km (500 mi) long dome that has formed as a result of fault blocking within the West Antarctic Rift System.

Volcanism in the Marie Byrd Land Volcanic Province commenced at least 36 million years ago during the latest Eocene epoch. This activity has continued into the current Holocene epoch, with the largest volcanic eruption in the last 10,000 years having possibly taken place about 2,300 years ago.

== Volcanoes ==
- Ames Range
  - Mount Andrus
  - Mount Boennighausen
  - Mount Kauffman
  - Mount Kosciusko
- Crary Mountains
  - Boyd Ridge
  - Mount Frakes
  - Mount Steere
  - Mount Rees
- Executive Committee Range
  - Mount Cumming
  - Mount Hampton
  - Mount Hartigan
  - Mount Sidley
  - Mount Waesche
- Flood Range
  - Mount Berlin
  - Mount Bursey
    - Starbuck Crater
  - Mount Moulton
- McCuddin Mountains
  - Mount Petras
  - Mount Flint
- Mount Murphy
- Mount Siple
- Mount Takahe
- Toney Mountain
  - Downs Cone
  - Ellis Cone
