= Mount Berlin =

Volcano in West Antarctica

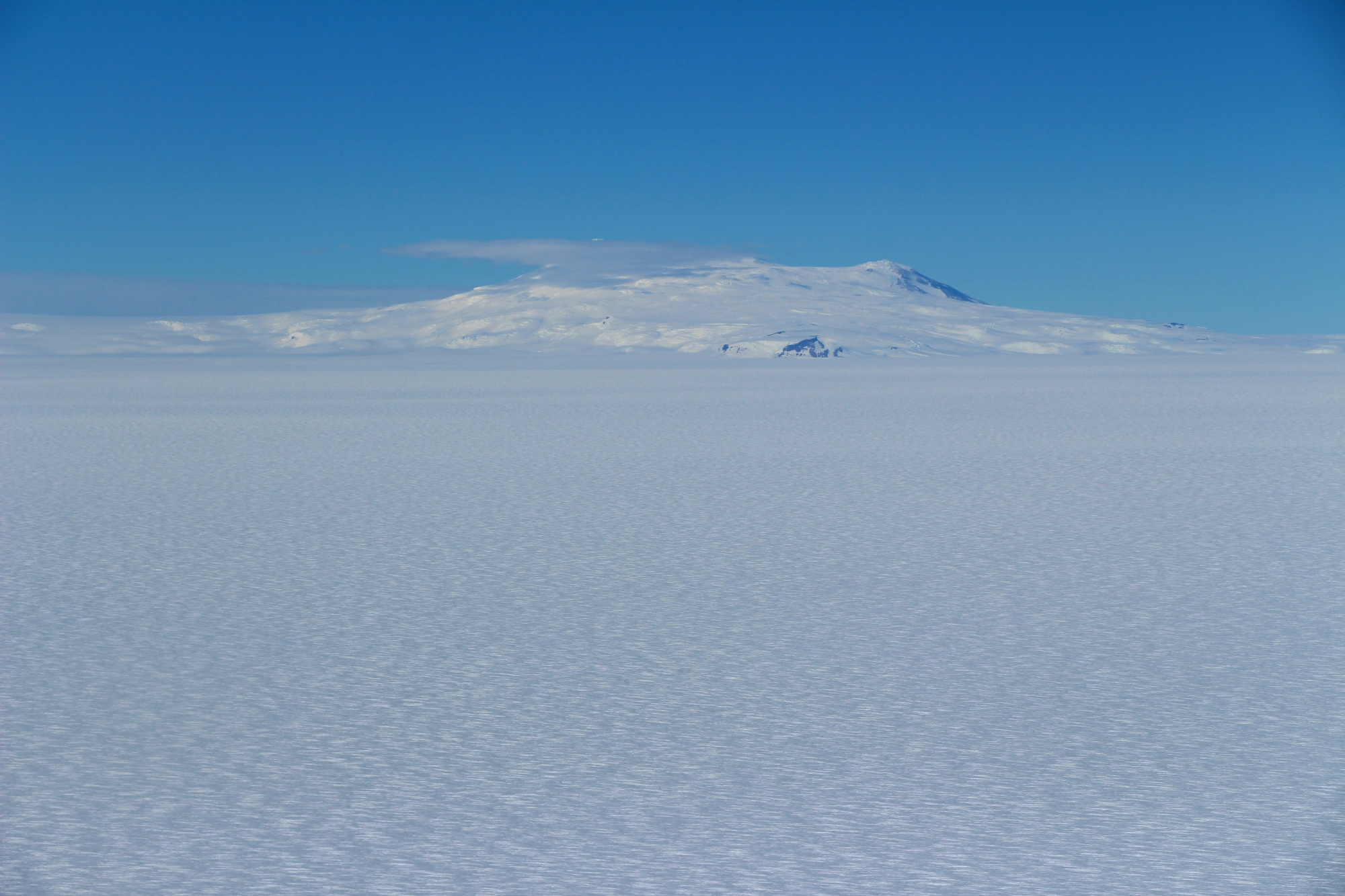
- View of Mount Berlin from the surrounding ice sheet

Highest point
- Elevation: 3,478 m (11,411 ft)
- Coordinates: 76°03′18″S 135°49′30″W

Geography
- Location within Antarctica
- Location: Marie Byrd Land, Antarctica

Geology
- Last eruption: 8,350±5,300 BCE

Mount Berlin is a glacier-covered volcano in Marie Byrd Land, Antarctica, 100 kilometres (62 mi) from the Amundsen Sea. It is a roughly 20-kilometre-wide (12 mi) mountain with parasitic vents that consists of two coalesced volcanoes: Berlin proper with the 2-kilometre-wide (1.2 mi) Berlin Crater and Merrem Peak with a 2.5-by-1-kilometre-wide (1.55 mi × 0.62 mi) crater, 3.5 kilometres (2.2 mi) away from Berlin. The summit of the volcano is 3,478 metres (11,411 ft) above sea level. It has a volume of 200 cubic kilometres (48 mi^{3}) and rises from the West Antarctic Ice Sheet. It is part of the Marie Byrd Land Volcanic Province. Trachyte is the dominant volcanic rock and occurs in the form of lava flows and pyroclastic rocks.

The volcano began erupting during the Pliocene and was active into the late Pleistocene and the Holocene. Several tephra (Note: Tephra are volcanic rocks formed from fragments generated during explosive eruptions.) layers encountered in ice cores all over Antarctica – but in particular at Mount Moulton – have been linked to Mount Berlin, which is the most important source of such tephras in the region. The tephra layers were formed by explosive eruptions that generated high eruption columns. Presently, fumarolic activity occurs at Mount Berlin and forms ice towers from freezing steam.

== Geography and geomorphology ==
Mount Berlin lies in Marie Byrd Land, West Antarctica, 100 kilometres (62 mi) inland from the Hobbs Coast of the Amundsen Sea. The volcano was studied during field trips in December 1940, November 1967, November–December 1977 and 1994–1995. It is named after Leonard M. Berlin, who led the 1940 research visit to the mountain.

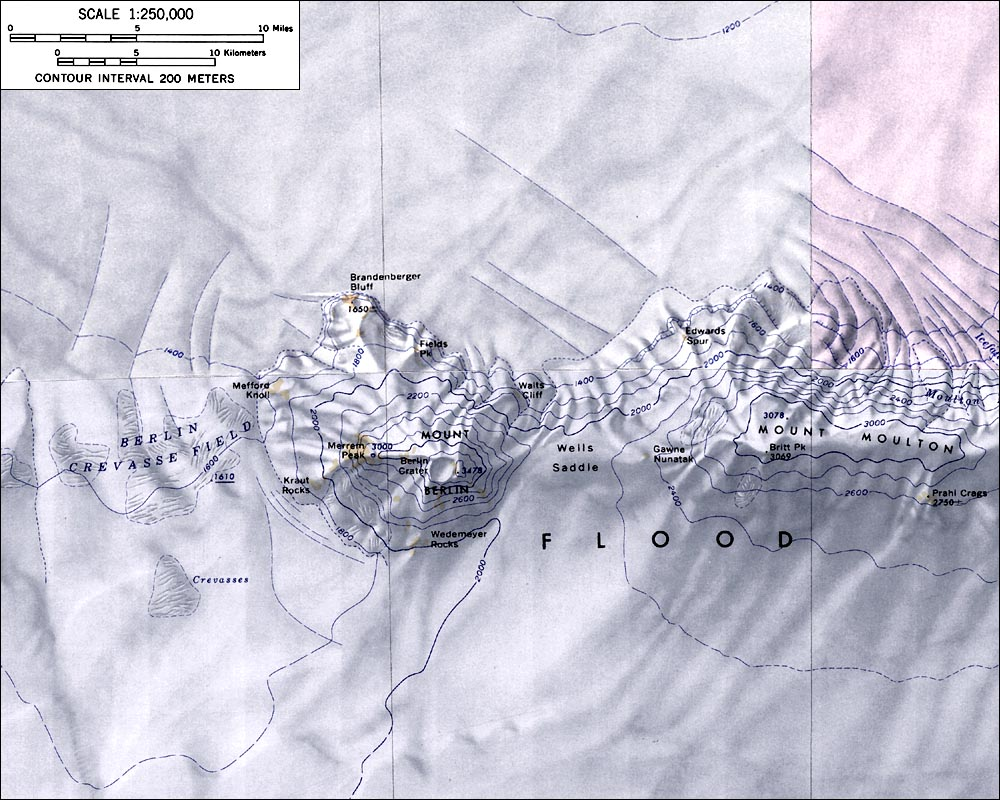
Topographical map of Mount Berlin

Mount Berlin reaches a height of 3,478 metres (11,411 ft) above sea level, making it the highest volcano in the Flood Range. It is the western end of the range; Wells Saddle separates it from Mount Moulton volcano farther east. Mount Berlin's peak is 2.1 kilometres (1.3 mi) above the highest local elevation of the West Antarctic Ice Sheet. (Note: Which reaches an elevation of 1,400 metres (4,600 ft) here and piles up against the volcano, resulting in a 800 metres (2,600 ft) height difference between the northern and southern flanks of Mount Berlin.) The summit crater (Berlin Crater) is 2 kilometres (1.2 mi) wide and has sharply defined, ice-crowned edges; the highest point of the volcano is on the southeastern margin. Mount Berlin consists of two overlapping edifices: Mount Berlin proper and Merrem Peak 3.5 kilometres (2.2 mi) west-northwest. Merrem Peak is about 3,000 metres (9,800 ft) high and has a 2.5-by-1-kilometre-wide (1.55 mi × 0.62 mi) crater at its summit. These craters are aligned east–west, like other Flood Range calderas. Mount Berlin has variously been described as a composite volcano, shield volcano or stratovolcano with a volume of about 200 cubic kilometres (48 cu mi). The entire combined edifice has a length of about 20 kilometres (12 mi). Its slopes have inclinations of about 12–13°.

The volcano is covered by glaciers, resulting in only a few rocky outcrops being visible on the mountain. Despite this, the volcano is considered to be well-exposed in comparison to other volcanoes in the region. Monogenetic volcanoes on the northern flank of Mount Berlin have generated two outcrops of mafic lava and scoria, one of which is found at Mefford Knoll on a linear vent. On the southeastern flank, a fiamme-rich ignimbrite crops out and is correlated to a flank vent on the northeastern flank. A ridge extends northwestward from Merrem Peak; at its foot is Brandenberger Bluff, a 300-metre-high (980 ft) outcrop of lava and tuff. This structure formed phreatomagmatically; it was formerly interpreted as a subglacial hyaloclastite. Other topographical locations on Mount Berlin are Fields Peak on the northern flank, Kraut Rocks at the west-southwestern foot, Walts Cliff on the northeastern flank and Wedemeyer Rocks at the southern foot. The existence of tuyas has been reported from Mount Berlin. According to a 1972 report, tephra overlies ice at some sites. Nonvolcanic features include incipient cirques on the northern and western side.

== Geology ==
The Marie Byrd Land Volcanic Province features 18 central volcanoes and accompanying parasitic vents, which form islands off the coast or nunataks in the ice. Many of these volcanoes form distinct volcanic chains, such as the Executive Committee Range where volcanic activity has shifted westward at a rate of about 1 centimetre per year (0.4 in/year). Such a movement is also apparent in the Flood Range, where activity migrated from Mount Moulton to Mount Berlin. This movement appears to reflect the propagation of crustal fractures, as plate motion is extremely slow in the region. Volcanic activity appears to take place in three phases, an early mafic phase, often followed by a second felsic phase. End-stage volcanism occurs in the form of small cone-forming eruptions. Ignimbrites are rare in Marie Byrd Land; the outcrop on the southeastern flank of Mount Berlin is an uncommon exception.

Activity in the Marie Byrd Land Volcanic Province began during the middle Miocene and continued into the later Quaternary; argon-argon dating yielded ages as young as 8,200 years. Four volcanoes in the Marie Byrd Land Volcanic Province – Mount Berlin, Mount Siple, Mount Takahe and Mount Waesche – were classified as "possibly or potentially active" in the 1990 Antarctic Research Series by LeMasurier et al., and active subglacial volcanoes have been identified on the basis of aerophysical surveys.

The volcanic province is related to the West Antarctic Rift which is interpreted as a rift or as a plate boundary. The West Antarctic Rift has been volcanically and tectonically active over the past 30–25 million years. The basement crops out near the coast and consists of Paleozoic rocks with intruded granites from the Cretaceous and Devonian period; these were flattened by erosion, leaving a Cretaceous erosion surface on which volcanoes rest. The volcanic activity at Mount Berlin may ultimately relate to the presence of a mantle plume that is impinging onto the crust in Marie Byrd Land.

=== Local deposits ===
Two pyroclastic fallout deposits crop out in the crater rim, reaching thicknesses of 150 metres (490 ft). Other outcrops of fallout deposits occur at Merrem Peak. The Mount Berlin deposits reach thicknesses of more than 70 metres (230 ft) close to the crater, diminishing to 1 metre (3 ft) at Merrem Peak. They were formed by pyroclastic fallout during eruptions, which mantled the topography. As eruption characteristics changed, these processes generated distinct deposits. Tuff deposits containing lapilli and volcanic ash-rich pyroclastic deposits in the crater rim were erupted during hydromagmatic events.

Some lava flows feature levee-like forms at their margins. In the past, certain fallout deposits in the crater rim were thought to be lava flows. Hyalotuff, obsidian and pumice have been recovered from Mount Berlin. Both welded and unwelded pyroclastic and tuffaceous breccias are present. They consist of lava bombs, lithic rocks, obsidian fragments and pumice. Hyaloclastite occurs around the base of Mount Berlin.

=== Composition ===
Most volcanic rocks of Mount Berlin define a trachyte suite, which features both comendite and pantellerite. Phonolite is less common. Mafic rocks have been reported from flank vents, basanite and hawaiite from Mefford Knoll, benmoreite from the southeastern flank at Wedemeyer Rocks, phonotephrite from Brandenberger Bluff, and mugearite without any particular locality.

Phenocrysts make up only a small portion of the volume and consist mostly of alkali feldspar, with subordinate apatite, fayalite, hedenbergite and opaque minerals. Benmoreite has more phenocrysts, which include anorthoclase, magnetite, olivine, plagioclase, pyroxene and titanaugite. Groundmass include basanite, mafic rocks, trachyte and trachy-phonolite. Xenoliths are also recorded.

The magma erupted from Mount Berlin appears to have originated in the form of discrete small batches rather than in one large magma chamber. The composition of volcanic rocks varied between eruptions and probably also during different phases of the same eruption. Phonolite was erupted early during volcanic evolution and followed by trachyte during the Quaternary. A long-term trend in iron and sulfur of the tephras may indicate a tendency towards more primitive magma (Note: Primitive magmas are magmas that haven't undergone significant differentiation, e.g through the interaction with the crust, yet.) compositions.

== Eruption history ==
Mount Berlin was active from the Pliocene into the Holocene. The oldest parts are found at Wedemeyer Rocks and Brandenberger Bluff and are 2.7 million years old. Activity then took place at Merrem Peak between 571,000 and 141,000 years ago; during this phase eruptions also occurred on the flanks of Mount Berlin. After 25,500 years ago activity shifted to Mount Berlin proper and the volcano grew by more than 400 metres (1,300 ft). Over time, volcanic activity on Mount Berlin has moved in a south-southeast direction.

Eruptions of Berlin include both effusive eruptions, that emplaced cinder cones and lava flows, and intense explosive eruptions (Plinian eruptions) which generated eruption columns up to 40 kilometres (25 mi) high. Such eruptions would have injected tephra into the stratosphere (Note: A process facilitated by the low height of the tropopause over Antarctica.) and deposited it across the southern Pacific Ocean and the West Antarctic Ice Sheet. The patterns of tephra deposition indicate that westerly winds transported tephra from Mount Berlin over Antarctica. During the last 100,000 years Mount Berlin has been more active than Mount Takahe, the other major source of tephra in the West Antarctic, but activity at Berlin was episodic rather than steady and was influenced by changes in magma supply and the way magma supply interacts with changes in the ice sheet, while a direct glacial influence on volcanic activity is not obvious until 10,000 years ago. The volcano underwent a surge in activity between 35,000/40,000 and 18,000/20,000 years ago. Despite their size, the eruptions at Mount Berlin did not significantly impact the climate.

The eruption history of Mount Berlin is recorded in outcrops on the volcano, in a blue-ice area on Mount Moulton, (Note: At Mount Moulton about 40 tephra layers linked to Mount Berlin have been identified although some of these tephra layers may have been erupted by Mount Moulton. Not all of these tephra layers correspond to known eruption deposits on Mount Berlin, perhaps due to burial beneath younger eruptions; and not all eruptions of Mount Berlin are recorded at Mount Moulton, perhaps due to erosion by wind or due to winds transporting tephra elsewhere.) 30 kilometres (19 mi) away, at Mount Waesche, in ice cores (Note: Some of the tephra layers in the Byrd Station ice core were originally interpreted as being products of Mount Takahe.) and in marine sediment cores from the Southern Ocean. Several tephra layers found in ice cores all across Antarctica have been attributed to West Antarctic volcanoes and in particular to Mount Berlin. Tephras deposited by this volcano have been used to date (Note: Tephra layers from volcanoes can be used to date ice cores in Antarctica. Accurate dating is important for the correct interpretation of the wealth of environmental data in ice cores. Traces of volcanic activity in ice cores allow reconstructions of the effect that volcanic activity had on climate. Dating the age of ice also has implications for forecasting the future development of the West Antarctic Ice Sheet under anthropogenic global warming, as it has been hypothesised that this ice sheet collapsed during the marine isotope stage 5 interglacial; finding ice older than this in the West Antarctic Ice Sheet would falsify the hypothesis.) ice cores, establishing that ice at Mount Moulton is at least 492,000 years old and thus the oldest ice of West Antarctica. Dusty layers in ice cores have also been linked to Mount Berlin and other volcanoes in Antarctica.

=== Chronology ===
The location of some places mentioned in the text, excluding Mount Moulton which is close to Mount Berlin

Among eruptions recorded at Mount Berlin are:

- 492,400±9,700 years ago, recorded at Mount Moulton. A 443,000±52,000 years old lava at Merrem Peak may correlate to this eruption.
- Tephras in the Vostok Station ice cores of East Antarctica deposited 406,000 years ago may have came from Mount Berlin.
- Cinder cones at Mefford Knoll have been dated to be 211,000±18,000 years old. Potassium-argon dating there and at Kraut Rocks has yielded ages of 630,000±30,000 and 620,000±50,000 years, respectively.
- 141,600±7,500 years ago, recorded at Mount Moulton. It may correspond to a 141,400±5,400 years old deposit at Merrem Peak. A 141,700-year-old tephra layer at Vostok has been related to this Mount Moulton tephra.
- The Marine Tephra B, which has been identified in marine sediment cores and the Dome Fuji ice core, was erupted by Mount Berlin 130,700±1,800 years ago. It is used as a stratigraphic marker for the transition between marine isotope stages 6 and 5.
- 118,700±2,500 years ago, recorded at Mount Moulton and potentially also at Talos Dome. Correlated deposits at Siple Ice Dome indicate that this eruption was intense and deposited tephra over large areas.
- 106,300±2,400 years ago, recorded at Mount Moulton.
- 92,500±2,000 and 92,200±900 years ago, as dated by argon-argon dating of its deposits around Mount Berlin. A tephra layer in Dome C and Dome Fuji ice cores recovered during European Project for Ice Coring in Antarctica and dated to be 89,000–87,000 years old has been attributed to this eruption on the basis of its composition. The nature of the trachytic tephra layer indicates that it was produced during an intense, multiphase eruption which may have led to compositional differences between deposits emplaced close and these emplaced far from the volcano. Deposits from this eruption have also been found in the Amundsen Sea, the Bellingshausen Sea, at a Vostok ice core and in marine sediments of the continental margin of West Antarctica ("tephra A").
- A 28,500-year-old tephra layer at Mount Erebus and in two ice cores of the West Antarctic Ice Sheet.
- 27,300±2,300 years ago, recorded at Mount Moulton.
- Ages of 25,500±2,000 years ago have been obtained from two lower welded pyroclastic units that crop out within Mount Berlin crater.
- Unwelded obsidian fallout units that crop out in Mount Berlin crater have been dated to be 18,200±5,800 years old.
- 14,500±3,800 years ago, recorded at Mount Moulton.
- A lava flow and tephra layers found both close to and away from Mount Berlin appear to have been produced during an extended eruption about 10,500±2,500 years ago.
- 9,718 BP, as dated in the Siple Dome A ice core. A lava flow on Mount Berlin and tephras at Mount Moulton have a similar composition though no exact match has been found.

Several tephra layers between 18,100 and 55,400 years old, found in Siple Dome ice cores, resemble those of Mount Berlin, as do tephras emplaced 9,346 and 2,067 BCE (interval 3.0 years) in the Siple Dome A ice core. The marine "Tephra B" and "Tephra C" layers may also come from Mount Berlin but statistical methods have not supported such a relationship at least for "Tephra B". A 694±7 before present tephra layer found in the TALDICE ice core in East Antarctica may come from Mount Berlin or from Mount Melbourne and may have been erupted at the same time as an eruption of The Pleiades. Roosevelt Island has yielded glass shards that may come from a 227 CE eruption.

== Last eruption and present-day activity ==
The date of the last eruption of Mount Berlin is unclear but the Global Volcanism Program gives a date of 10,300±5,300 BP. Because of its Holocene activity, the volcano is considered active and several volcano tectonic earthquakes have been recorded on Mount Berlin.

Mount Berlin is geothermally active, the only volcano in Marie Byrd Land with such activity. Steaming ice towers are found on the western and northern rim of Berlin Crater. Their existence was first reported in 1968; ice towers form when fumarole exhalations freeze in the cold Antarctic atmosphere and are a characteristic trait of Antarctic volcanoes. ASTER satellite imaging has not detected these fumaroles, presumably because they are hidden within the ice towers. A more than 70-metre-long (230 ft) ice cave begins at one of these ice towers; temperatures of over 12 °C (54 °F) have been recorded on the cave floor. These geothermal environments may host geothermal habitats similar to those in Victoria Land and at Deception Island, but Mount Berlin is remote and has never been studied in this regard. It has been evaluated for the potential to obtain geothermal power; being isolated and extensively covered with ice, these volcanoes are unlikely to have any significant economic value as geothermal resources.

== See also ==
- Berlin Crevasse Field
- List of volcanoes in Antarctica
