= Usas Escarpment =

Geographic feature in western Antarctica

Location of Usas Escarpment, Marie Byrd Land, Antarctica

Usas Escarpment (76°0′S 130°0′W) is an expansive but discontinuous north-facing escarpment in Marie Byrd Land, Antarctica. It is about 200 nautical miles (370 km; 230 mi) long, extending roughly west to east along the 76th parallel south from where the elevation of the snow surface descends toward the Ruppert Coast and Hobbs Coast. The position of the escarpment coincides with the north slopes of the Flood Range, Ames Range, McCuddin Mountains, and the eastern peaks of Mount Galla, Mount Aldaz, and Benes Peak.

== Location ==
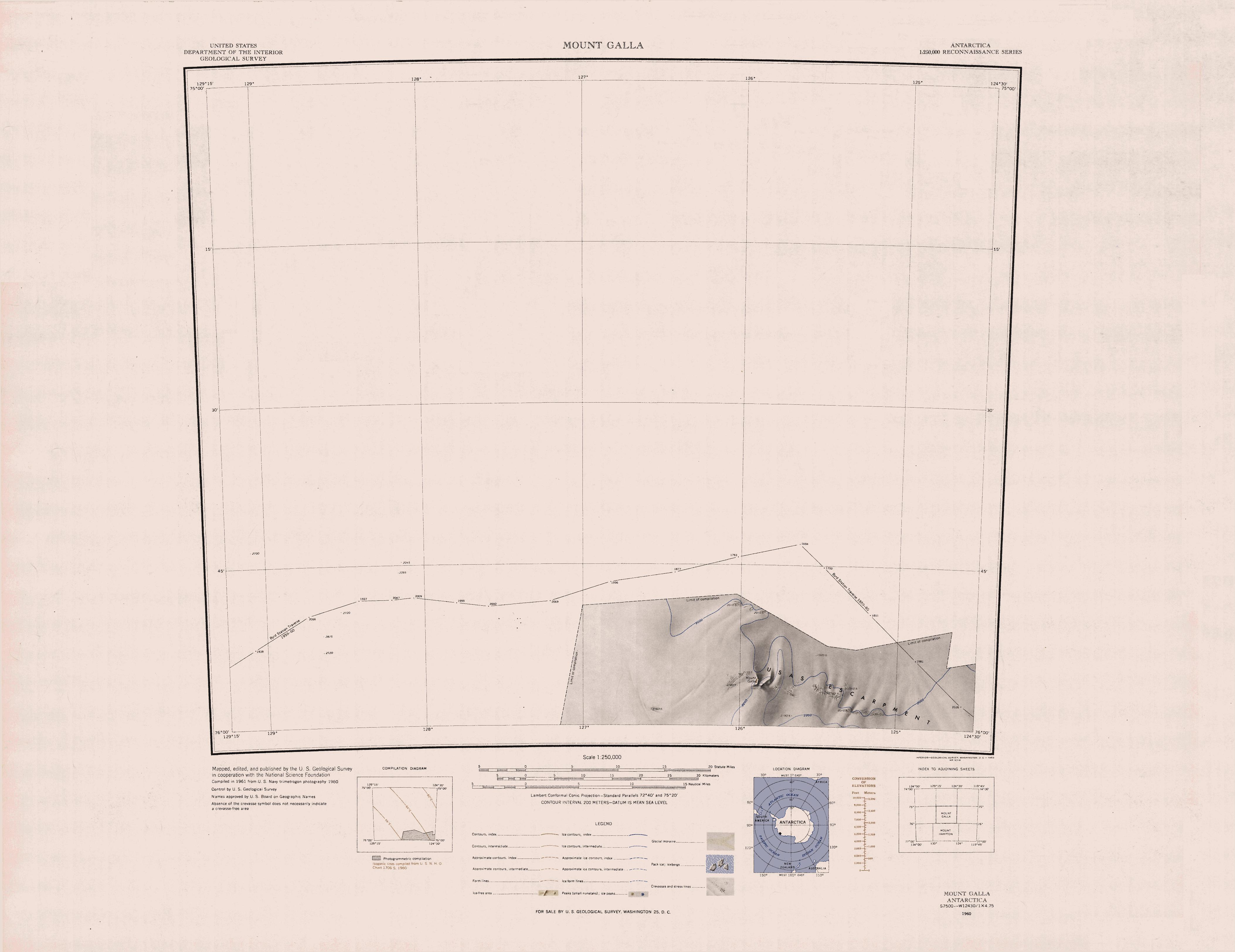
Northeast end of escarpment, southeast of map

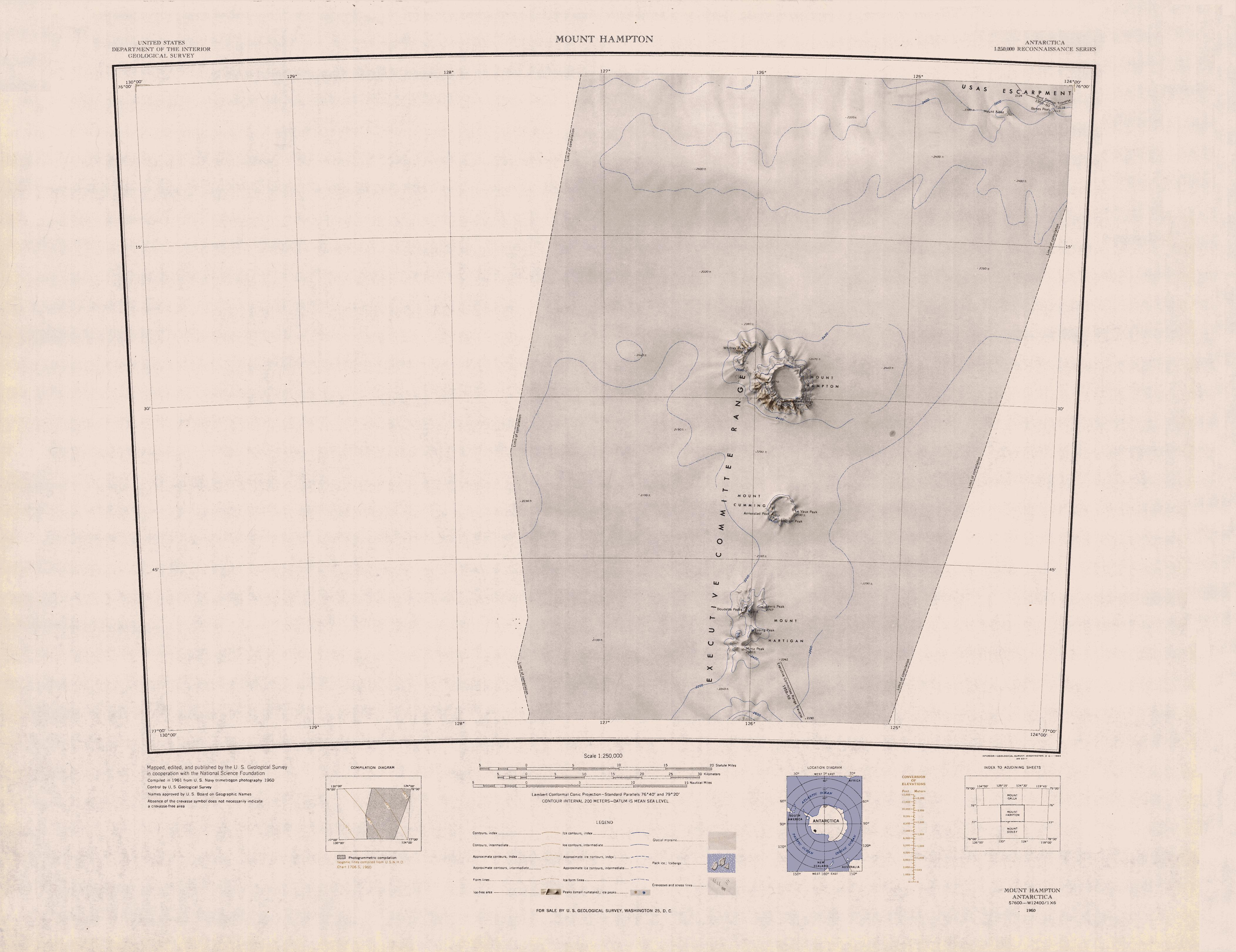
Southeast end of escarpment, northeast of map

The western end of the range is north of the Executive Committee Range. Mount Galla is towards the northeast end. Mount Aldaz and Benes Peak are further to the east.

== Exploration and name ==
The escarpment was observed by members of the United States Antarctic Service (USAS), 1939–41, and in ensuing scientific reports was referred to as 76th Parallel Escarpment. The approved name is an acronym for the discovery expedition.

== Features ==
Features of the eastern end of the escarpment, from west to east, are:

=== Mount Galla ===
75°56′S 125°52′W. Snow-capped mountain 2,520 metres (8,270 ft) high which rises above the Usas Escarpment, 31 nautical miles (57 km; 36 mi) east of Mount Petras in the McCuddin Mountains. Mapped by the United States Geological Survey (USGS) from surveys and United States Navy air photos, 1959-65. Named by the United States Advisory Committee on Antarctic Names (US-ACAN) for Lieutenant Edward J. Galla, United States Navy, who was medical doctor and leader of support personnel at Byrd Station, 1959.

=== Mount Aldaz ===
76°03′S 124°25′W. A projecting-type mountain 2,520 metres (8,270 ft) high that barely protrudes from the ice-covered Usas Escarpment, 22 nautical miles (41 km; 25 mi) east-southeast of Mount Galla. The mountain is mostly ice-covered, but has notable rock outcroppings along its northern spur. Surveyed by USGS on the Executive Committee Range Traverse of 1959. Named by US-ACAN for Luis Aldaz, Meteorologist and Scientific Leader at Byrd Station, 1960.

=== Benes Peak ===
76°02′S 124°07′W. A peak 2,450 metres (8,040 ft) high that is almost entirely snow-covered, situated along the Usas Escarpment, 4 nautical miles (7.4 km; 4.6 mi) east of Mount Aldaz. Surveyed by USGS on the Executive Committee Range Traverse of 1959. Named by US-ACAN for Norman S. Benes, USARP meteorologist at Byrd Station, 1961.

== See also ==
- List of escarpments

== Sources ==
- Alberts, Fred G., ed. (1995), Geographic Names of the Antarctic (PDF) (2 ed.), United States Board on Geographic Names This article incorporates public domain material from websites or documents of the United States Board on Geographic Names.
- This article incorporates public domain material from websites or documents of the United States Geological Survey.
