= Ames Range =

Mountain range in Antarctica

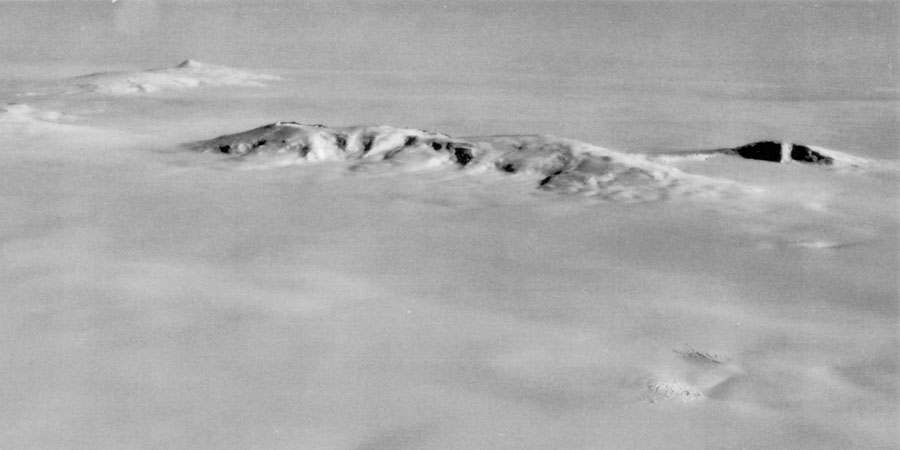
- Aerial view of the Ames Range. Mount Andrus is the first mount from the left, excluding Mount Berlin, which can be seen isolated far away

Highest point
- Peak: Mount Andrus
- Elevation: 2,978 m (9,770 ft)
- Coordinates: 75°42′S 132°20′W

Geography
- Location within Antarctica
- Continent: Antarctica
- Region: Marie Byrd Land

Geology
- Formed by: Shield volcanoes
- Volcanic field: Marie Byrd Land Volcanic Province

The Ames Range (75°42′S 132°20′W) is a range of snow-covered, flat-topped, steep-sided mountains, extending in a north–south direction for 20 nautical miles (37 km; 23 mi) and forming a right angle with the eastern end of the Flood Range in Marie Byrd Land, Antarctica.

== Location ==
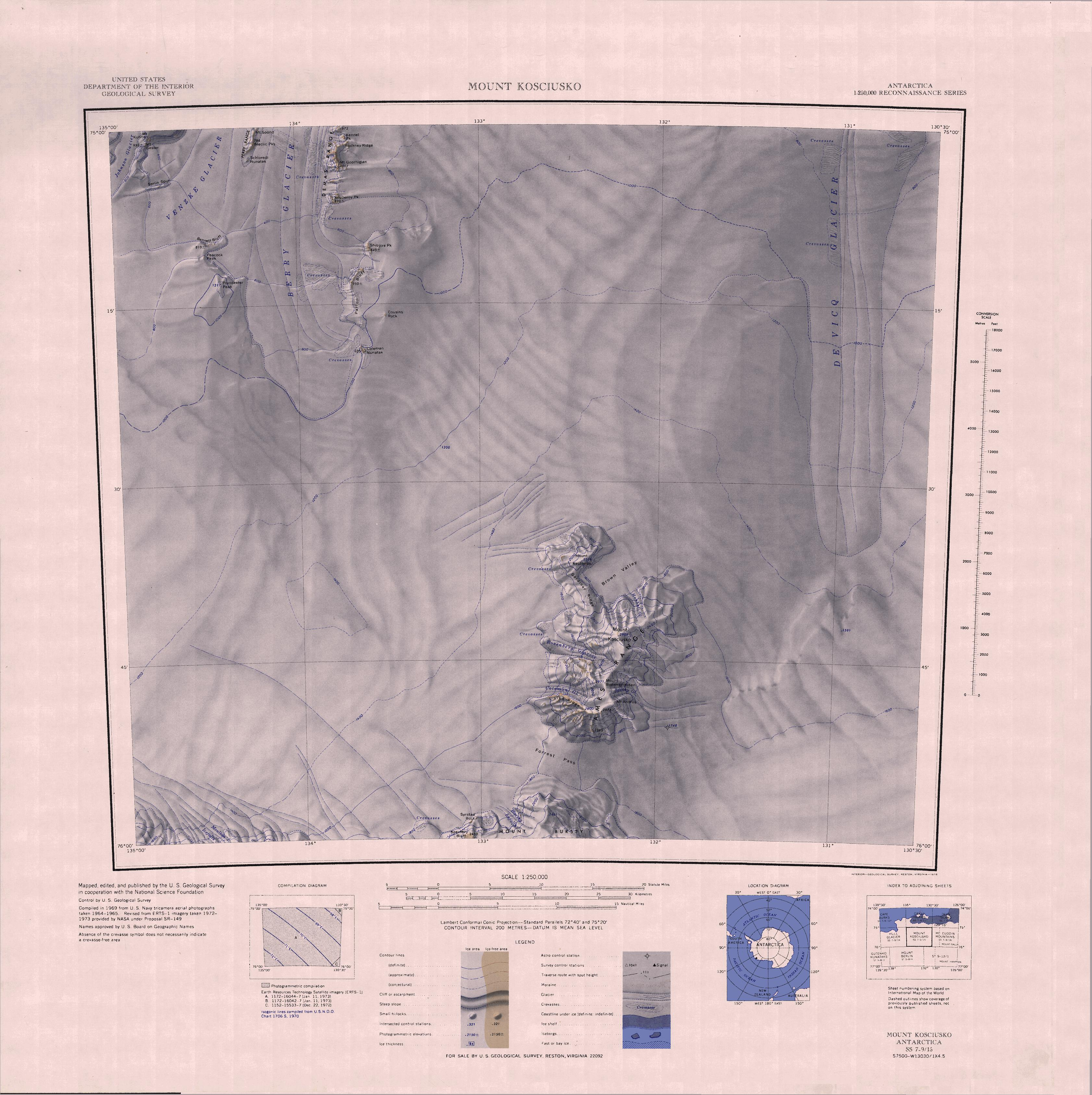
Ames Range in southeast of map

The Ames Range is northwest of the Mount Bursey massif in the Flood Range, from which it is separated by Forrest Pass, and southeast of the Berry Glacier and Demas Range. Glaciers draining the range include Coleman Glacier and Rosenberg Glacier on the west side, Jacoby Glacier on the east side and Herbst Glacier to the north. Peaks include Mount Andrus, Mount Boenninghausen, Mount Kosciusco and Mount Kauffman. Other features include Lind Ridge, Gardiner Ridge and Brown Valley.

== Discovery and naming ==
The Ames Range was discovered by the United States Antarctic Service (USAS; 1939–41) and named by Richard E. Byrd for his father-in-law, Joseph Ames.

== Geology ==
The Ames Range consists of three coalescing shield volcanoes: Mount Andrus, Mount Kosciusko and Mount Kauffman, and Mount Boennighausen. The north slopes of the range are in the west of the Usas Escarpment.

== Glaciers ==
=== Coleman Glacier ===
75°47′S 132°33′W. A steep, heavily-crevassed glacier draining westward from Mount Andrus in the south part of Ames Range. Mapped by the United States Geological Survey (USGS) from surveys and United States Navy air photos, 1959-65. Named by the United States Advisory Committee on Antarctic Names (US-ACAN) for Master Sergeant Clarence N. Coleman, United States Army, member of the Army-Navy Trail Party that traversed eastward to establish Byrd Station in 1956.

=== Rosenberg Glacier ===
75°44′S 132°33′W. A steep, heavily-crevassed glacier draining the west slopes of the Ames Range between Mount Kosciusko and Mount Boennighausen. Mapped by USGS from surveys and United States Navy air photos, 1959-65. Named by US-ACAN for Theodore J. Rosenberg, ionospheric physicist at Siple Station, 1970-71.

=== Jacoby Glacier ===
75°48′S 132°06′W. A steep glacier draining the east slopes of the Ames Range between Mount Boennighausen and Mount Andrus. Mapped by USGS from surveys and United States Navy air photos, 1959-65. Named by US-ACAN for William J. Jacoby, driller at Byrd Station, 1968-69.

=== Herbst Glacier ===
75°40′S 132°07′W. The eastern glacier of two that drain the north slopes of Mount Kosciusko and reach Brown Valley. Mapped by USGS from surveys and United States Navy air photos, 1959-65. Named by US-ACAN for Emmett L. Herbst of Holmes and Narver, Inc., who participated in the drilling program at Byrd Station, 1968-69. He worked at McMurdo Station and other Antarctic areas in several seasons, 1971-76.

== Features ==
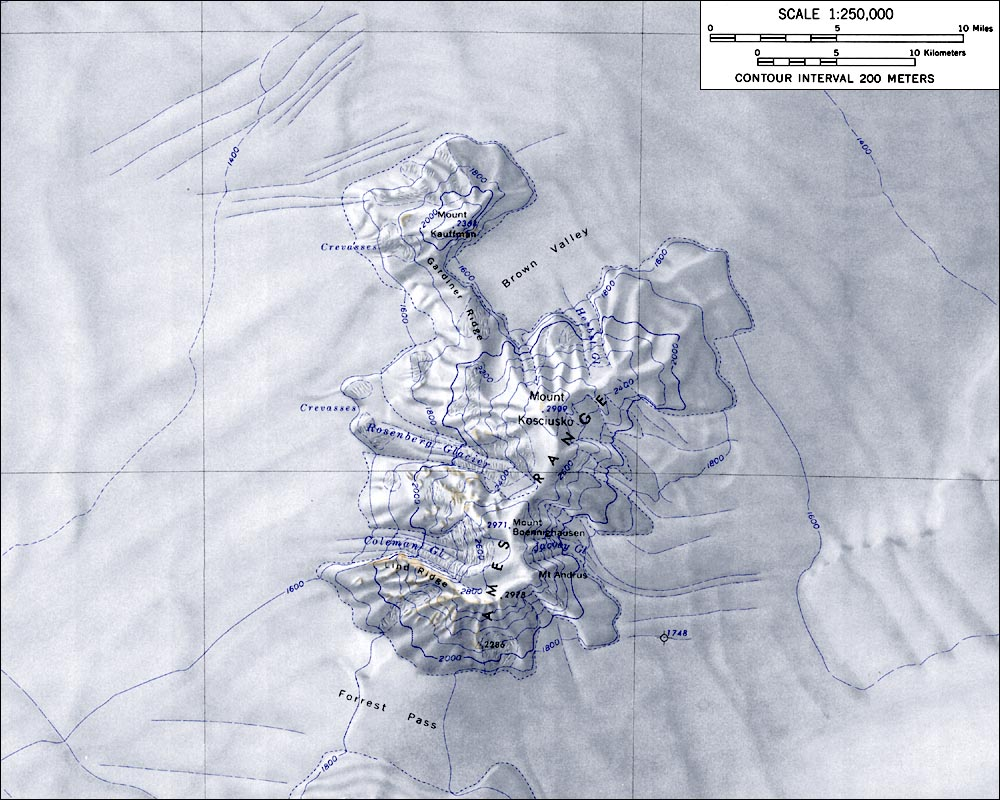
Map of the Ames Range

Features, from south to north, include:

=== Forrest Pass ===
75°53′S 132°34′W. A broad ice-filled pass between Mount Bursey, in the Flood Range, and the southern elevations of the Ames Range. Mapped by USGS from surveys and United States Navy air photos, 1959-65. Named by US-ACAN for Robert B. Forrest, USARP glaciologist with the Byrd Station Traverse of 1962-63.

=== Lind Ridge ===
75°48′S 132°33′W. A ridge forming the south wall of Coleman Glacier. Mapped by USGS from surveys and United States Navy air photos, 1959-65. Named by US-ACAN for Larry W. Lind, glaciologist at Byrd Station, 1968-69.

=== Mount Andrus ===
75°48′S 132°14′W. A peak 2 nautical miles (3.7 km; 2.3 mi) southeast of Mount Boennighausen in the southeast extremity of Ames Range. Mapped by USGS from surveys and United States Navy air photos, 1964-68. Named by US-ACAN for Lieutenant Carl H. Andrus, United States Navy, medical officer and Officer-in-Charge of Byrd Station in 1964.

=== Mount Boennighausen ===
75°47′S 132°18′W. Snow-covered mountain 2,970 metres (9,740 ft) high located 4 nautical miles (7.4 km; 4.6 mi) south-southwest of Mount Kosciusko. Mapped by USGS from surveys and United States Navy air photos, 1959-65. Named by US-ACAN for Lieutenant Commander Thomas L. Boennighausen, CEC, United States Navy, Officer-in-Charge of the nuclear power plant at McMurdo Station, 1966. He served as Civil Engineer on the staff of the Commander, United States Naval Support Force, Antarctica, 1969–70 and 1970-71.

=== Mount Kosciusko ===
75°43′S 132°13′W. Prominent mountain 2,910 metres (9,550 ft) high that comprises the central portion of the Ames Range. Mapped by USGS from surveys and United States Navy air photos, 1959-65. Named by US-ACAN for Captain Henry M. Kosciusko, United States Navy, Commander of the Antarctic Support Activities group, 1965-67.

=== Gardiner Ridge ===
75°39′S 132°26′W. A ridge extending from Mount Kauffman to Mount Kosciusko in the Ames Range. Mapped by USGS from surveys and United States Navy air photos, 1959-65. Named by US-ACAN for James E. Gardiner, GDI, United States Navy, Construction Driver and member of the Army-Navy Trail Party which blazed trail from Little America V to establish Byrd Station in 1956.

=== Brown Valley ===
75°38′S 132°12′W. A rectangular ice-covered valley between Mount Kauffman and Mount Kosciusko in the northeast end of Ames Range. Mapped by USGS from surveys and United States Navy air photos, 1959-65. Named by US-ACAN after Thomas I. Brown, USARP meteorologist at Byrd Station in 1963.

=== Mount Kauffman ===
75°37′S 132°25′W. Prominent mountain 2,365 metres (7,759 ft) high that surmounts the northwest end of Ames Range. Mapped by USGS from surveys and United States Navy air photos, 1959-65. Named by US-ACAN for Commander S.K. Kauffman, United States Navy, staff civil engineering officer who supervised the planning and building of Plateau Station, 1965-66.

== Sources ==
- Alberts, Fred G., ed. (1995), Geographic Names of the Antarctic (PDF) (2 ed.), United States Board on Geographic Names This article incorporates public domain material from websites or documents of the United States Board on Geographic Names.
- Mount Kosciusco, USGS: United States Geological Survey
- This article incorporates public domain material from websites or documents of the United States Geological Survey.
