= Flood Range =

Mountain range in Antarctica

- Location within Antarctica

Highest point
- Peak: Mount Berlin
- Elevation: 3,478 m (11,411 ft)

Geography
- Continent: Antarctica
- Region: Marie Byrd Land
- Range coordinates: 76°03′S 134°30′W

Geology
- Formed by: Shield volcanoes
- Volcanic field: Marie Byrd Land Volcanic Province

The Flood Range (76°03′S 134°30′W) is a range of large snow-covered mountains extending in an east–west direction for about 60 nautical miles (110 km; 69 mi) and forming a right angle with the southern end of the Ames Range in Marie Byrd Land, Antarctica.

== Location ==
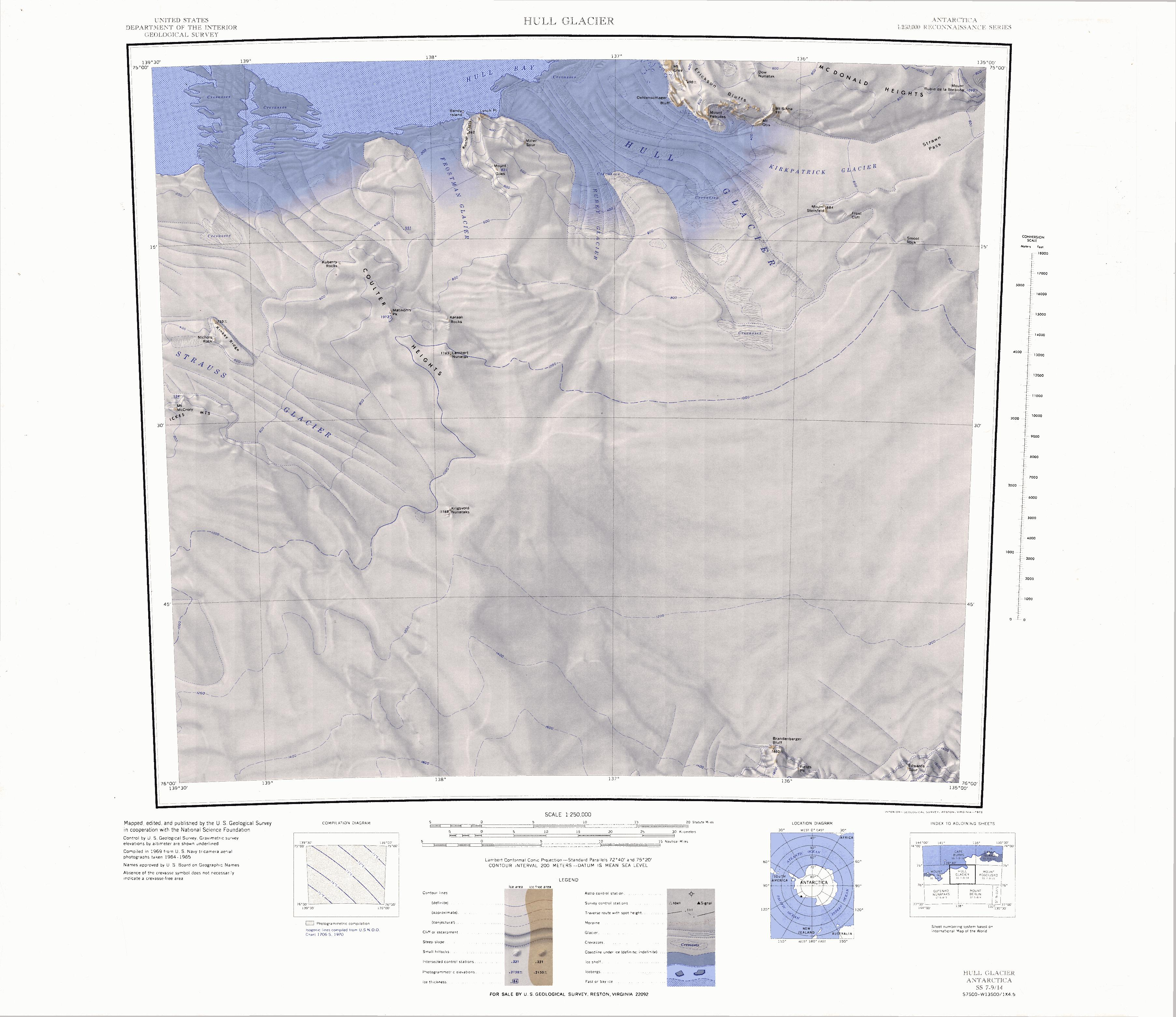
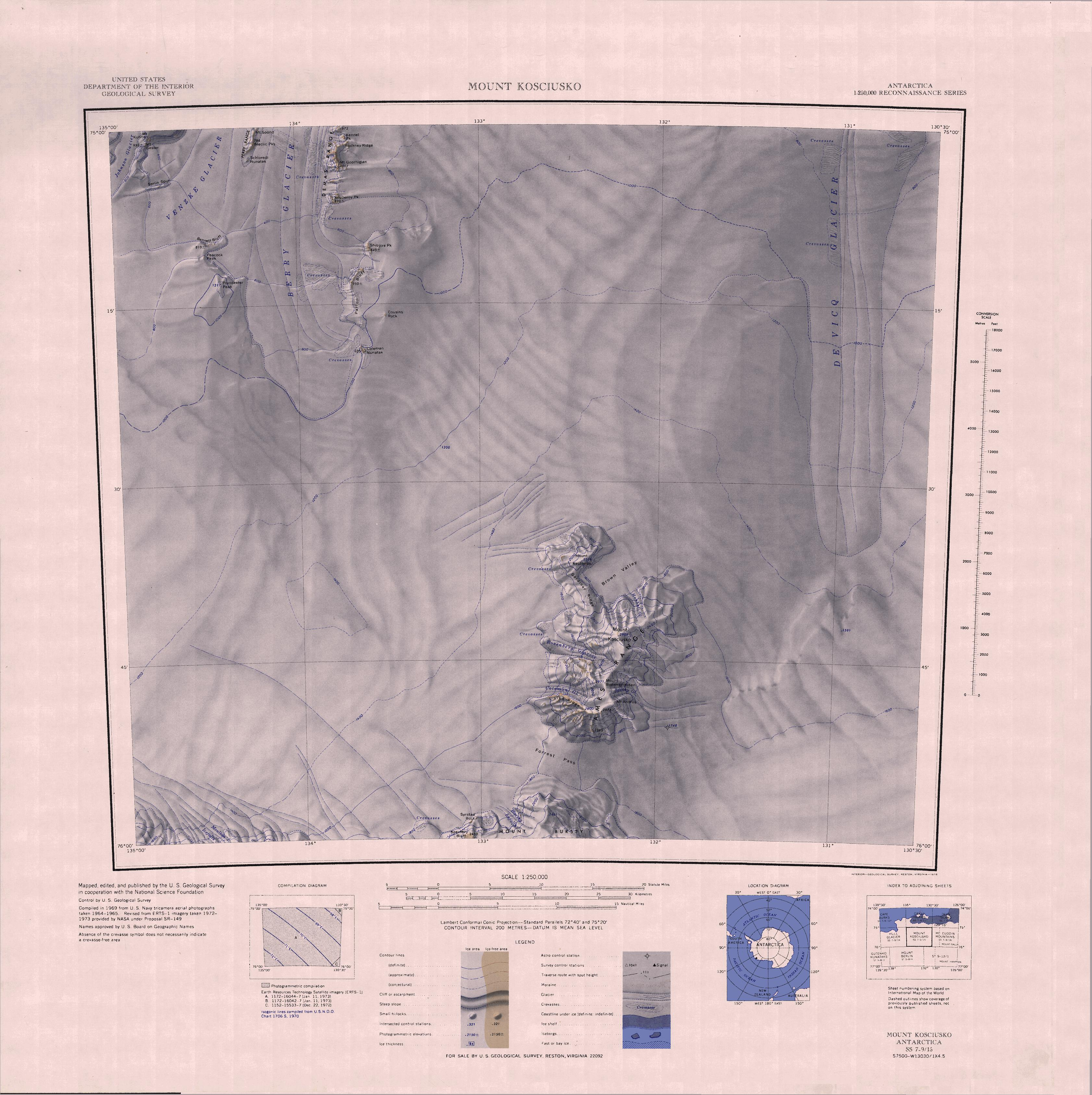
Northern part of Flood Range in south of maps

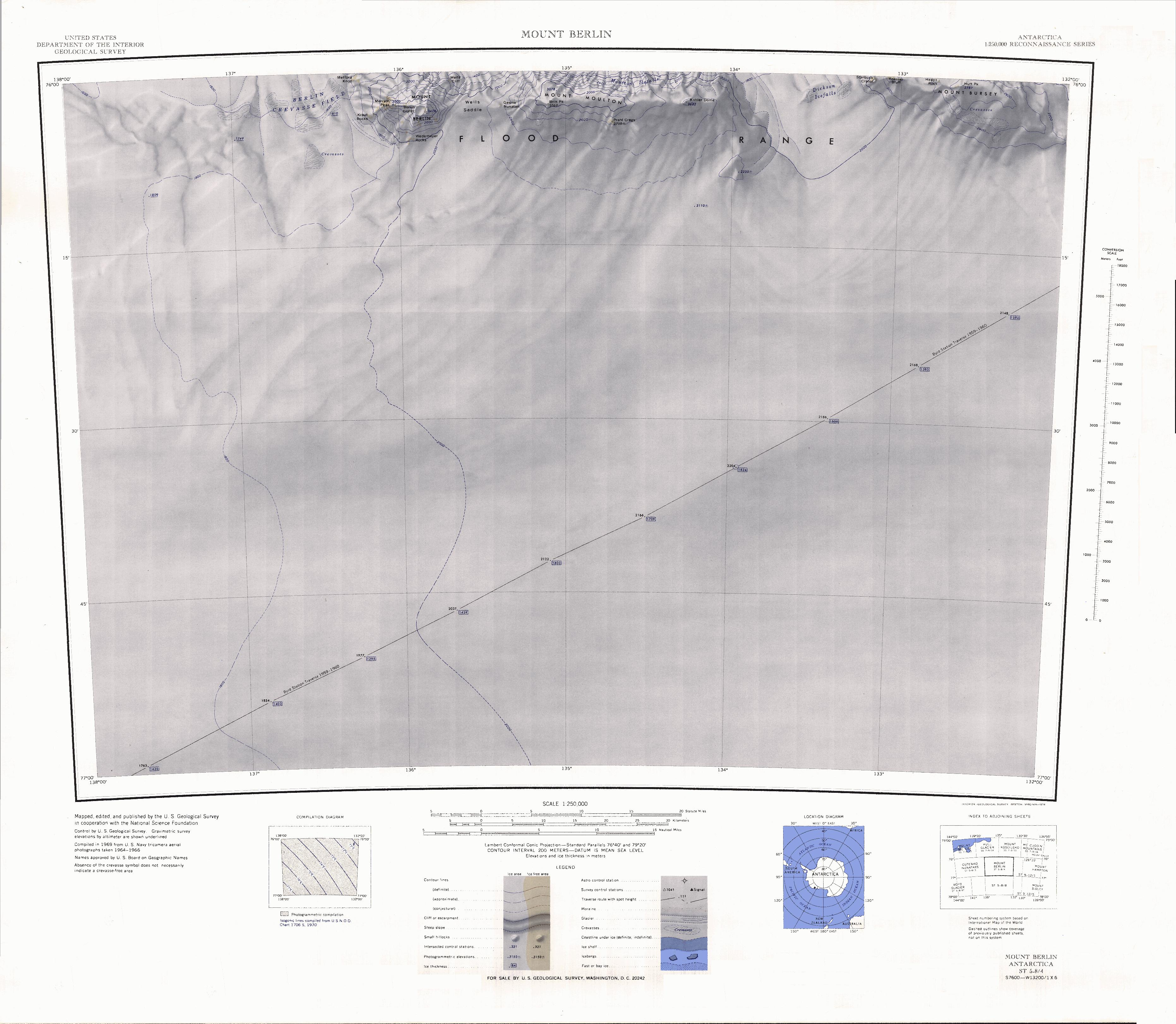
Southern part of the range in north of map

The Flood Range is south of the Hull Glacier and Kirkpatrick Glacier, which drain into Hull Bay on the Southern Ocean coast of Marie Byrd Land. The eastern end of the range is immediately south of the Ames Range. There are no named features in the ice sheet to the south of the range. The north slopes of the range form the western end of the Usas Escarpment.

== Discovery and name ==
The Flood Range was discovered by the Byrd Antarctic Expedition (ByrdAE) in 1934 from a great distance. Reconnaissance flights by the United States Antarctic Service (USAS) (1939–41) explored the range. The principle mountain was named "Mount Hal Flood" by Richard E. Byrd for his uncle, the Hon. Henry D. Flood, U.S. Representative from Virginia. The name was subsequently transferred by United States Special Committee on Antarctic Names, 1943-47 (US-SCAN) from the mountain to the entire range.

== Geology ==
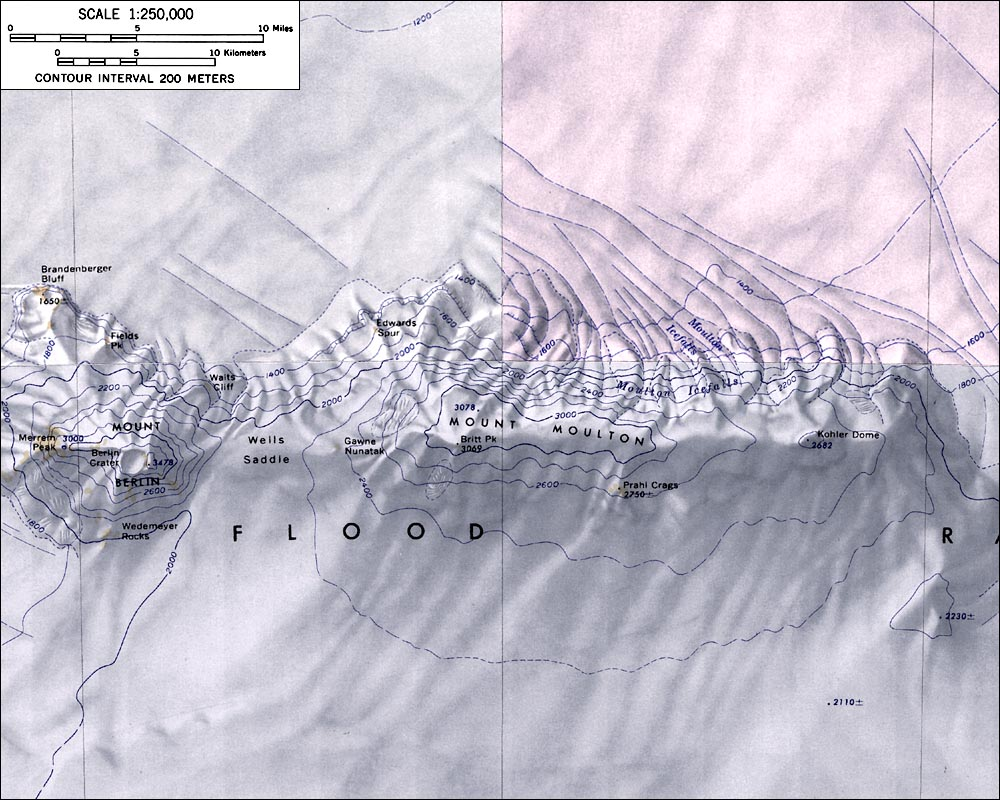
Map of the western part of Flood Range

The Flood Range consists of a linear volcanic chain of peaks in which there have been systematic migrations of felsic activity. This activity has moved 90 km from east to west between 9 million and 2.5 million years ago, and 154 km northward from the south end of the Ames Range toward Shepard Island between 12.7 and 0.6 million years ago.

== Western features ==
Features on or near Mount Berlin include Brandenberger Bluff and Fields Peak in the north, the Berlin Crevasse Field, Melford Knoll, Kraut Rocks, and Merrem Peak to the west, and Berlin Crater, Wedemeyer Rocks, Walts Cliff and Wells Saddle to the east.

=== Mount Berlin ===
76°03′S 135°52′W. A prominent, conical mountain, 3,500 metres (11,500 ft) high, standing 10 nautical miles (19 km; 12 mi) west of Mount Moulton at the west end of the Flood Range. Discovered by the ByrdAE on flights to the northeast and east of Little America in November–December 1934. Named "Mount Hal Flood" by Byrd, but the name Flood is now applied to the entire mountain range of which this is a part. Named by the US-SCAN for Leonard M. Berlin, leader of the USAS party which sledged to this mountain in December 1940.

=== Berlin Crater ===
76°03′S 135°52′W. A high and circular ice-filled crater near the summit of Mount Berlin. Mapped by USGS from ground surveys and United States Navy air photos, 1959–66. Named by US-ACAN in association with Mount Berlin.

=== Brandenberger Bluff ===
75°58′S 136°05′W. A steep rock bluff 1,650 metres (5,410 ft) high at the extreme north side of Mount Berlin. Mapped by USGS from surveys and United States Navy air photos, 1959–65. Named by US-ACAN for Arthur J. Brandenberger, USARP glaciologist with the Byrd Station Traverse of 1962–63.

=== Fields Peak ===
75°59′S 135°56′W. A small but distinctive peak 2.5 nautical miles (4.6 km; 2.9 mi) southeast of Brandenberger Bluff on the lower north slopes of Mount Berlin. Mapped by USGS from surveys and United States Navy air photos, 1959–65. Named by US-ACAN for Master Sergeant Samuel J. Fields, United States Army, member of the 1956 Army-Navy Trail Party that blazed trail from Little America V to 80|S, 120|W, to establish Byrd Station.

=== Berlin Crevasse Field ===
76°03′S 136°30′W. A crevasse field, 10 nautical miles (19 km; 12 mi) in extent, located immediately west of Mount Berlin. Mapped by USGS from ground surveys and United States Navy air photos, 1959–66. Named by US-ACAN in association with Mount Berlin.

=== Melford Knoll ===
76°01′S 136°16′W. A rocky knoll or ledge on the lower west slopes of the Mount Berlin massif. Mapped by USGS from ground surveys and United States Navy air photos, 1959–66. Named by US-ACAN for Michael Mefford, a member of the USARP team that studied ice sheet dynamics in the area northeast of Byrd Station, 1971–72.

=== Kraut Rocks ===
76°04′S 136°11′W. A group of rock outcrops on the snow-covered, lower southwest slopes of the Mount Berlin massif. Mapped by USGS from surveys and United States Navy air photos, 1959–66. Named by US-ACAN for William F. Kraut, RM1, United States Navy, radioman with the 1956 Army Navy Trail Party that traversed eastward from Little America V to establish the Byrd Station.

=== Merrem Peak ===
76°03′S 136°03′W. A prominent peak of 3,000 metres (9,800 ft) high that is the secondary summit and is located 2 nautical miles (3.7 km; 2.3 mi) west of Berlin Crater. The peak was discovered and charted by the Pacific Coast Survey Party, led by Leonard Berlin, of the United States Antarctic Service in December 1940. Subsequently mapped by USGS from surveys and United States Navy air photos, 1959–66. Named by US-ACAN for Frank H. Merrem Jr., ionospheric physicist and Scientific Leader at South Pole Station, 1970.

=== Wedemeyer Rocks ===
76°06′S 135°56′W. A group of rocks that outcrop near the base of the southern slope of Mount Berlin. Mapped by USGS from ground surveys and United States Navy air photos, 1959–66. Named by US-ACAN for Charles H. Wedemeyer, CM1, United States Navy construction mechanic with the 1956 Army-Navy Trail Party that traversed eastward from Little America V to establish Byrd Station.

=== Walts Cliff ===
76°01′S 135°42′W. A rock cliff that is conspicuous from a great distance, marking the base of Mount Berlin at the northeast side. Mapped by USGS from ground surveys and United States Navy air photos, 1959–66. Named by US-ACAN for Dennis S. Walts of the United States Weather Bureau, meteorologist at South Pole Station, 1970.

=== Wells Saddle ===
76°03′S 135°35′W. A broad snow-filled saddle between Mount Berlin and Mount Moulton in the Flood Range of Marie Byrd Land. The saddle was photographed from aircraft of the US AS in December 1940. It was mapped by USGS from ground surveys and US Navy air photos, 1959–66. Named by US-ACAN for James H. Wells, a member of the USARP team that studied ice sheet dynamics in the area northeast of Byrd Station, 1971–72.

== Central features ==
Features on or near Mount Moulton include Edwards Spur and Moulton Icefalls in the north, Gawne Nunatak, Britt Peak, Kohler Dome in the south, and the Dickson Icefalls to the east.

=== Mount Moulton ===
76°03′S 135°08′W. A broad, ice-covered mountain 3,070 metres (10,070 ft) high, standing 10 nautical miles (19 km; 12 mi) east of Mount Berlin. Discovered on aerial flights by the United States Antarctic Service (USAS) in 1940, and named for Richard S. Moulton, chief dog driver at West Base and a member of the survey party which sledged to the west end of the Flood Range in December 1940.

=== Edwards Spur ===
75°59′S 135°18′W. A spur with a small rock exposure along its crest, located on the lower northwest slopes of Mount Moulton. Mapped by the United States Geological Survey (USGS) from surveys and United States Navy air photos, 1959–65. Named by the United States Advisory Committee on Antarctic Names (US-ACAN) for Alvah G. Edwards, GDI, United States Navy, Construction Driver with the Army-Navy Trail Party that traversed eastward from Little America V to establish Byrd Station in 1956.

=== Moulton Icefalls ===
76°00′S 134°35′W. The steep icefalls draining the northern slopes of Mount Moulton. Mapped by USGS from ground surveys and the United States Navy air photos, 1959–66. Named by US-ACAN in association with Mount Moulton.

=== Gawne Nunatak ===
76°03′S 135°24′W. A nunatak on the east side of Wells Saddle between Mount Berlin and Mount Moulton. Mapped by USGS from surveys and United States Navy air photos, 1959–66. Named by US-ACAN for Steven P. Gawne, a member of the USARP team that studied ice sheet dynamics in the area northeast of Byrd Station in the 1971–72 season.

=== Britt Peak ===
76°03′S 135°07′W. A small peak 3,070 metres (10,070 ft) high just southwest of the summit of Mount Moulton. Mapped by USGS from surveys and United States Navy air photos, 1959–66. Named byUS-ACAN for Dale R. Britt, BU2, United States Navy, a builder who wintered over at South Pole Station, 1969.

=== Kohler Dome ===
76°02′S 134°17′W. A rounded, snow-covered elevation 2,680 metres (8,790 ft) high that rises slightly above the general level of the extreme east part of the Mount Moulton massif. Mapped by USGS from ground surveys and United States Navy air photos, 1959–66. Named by US-ACAN for Robert E. Kohler of the United States Coast and Geodetic Survey, a geomagnetist/seismologist at Byrd Station, 1970.

=== Dickson Icefalls ===
76°02′S 133°25′W. A north-draining icefalls of moderate slope at an elevation of 1,800 to 2,000 metres (5,900 to 6,600 ft) high, located between Mount Moulton and Mount Bursey. Mapped by USGS from surveys and United States Navy air photos, 1959–65. Named by US-ACAN for Donald T. Dickson, USARP glaciologist with the Byrd Station Traverse of 1962–63.

== Eastern features ==
Features on or near Mount Bursey include Starbuck Crater, Koerner Bluff, Heaps Rock and Hutt Peak in the south, Syrstad Rock and Bursey Icefalls in the north.

=== Mount Bursey ===
76°01′S 132°38′W. A broad, ice-covered mountain, 2,780 metres (9,120 ft) high, which forms the east end of the Flood Range. Discovered by members of the USAS on aerial flights in 1940. Named for Jacob Bursey, member of the ByrdAE (1928–30) and dog-driver with the USAS party which sledged to the west end of the Flood Range in December 1940.

=== Starbuck Crater ===
76°01′S 133°11′W. A small snow-filled crater at the base of the west slope of the Mount Bursey massif in Marie Byrd Land. Mapped by USGS from ground surveys and United States Navy air photos, 1959–66. Named by US-ACAN for James E. Starbuck of Bartol Research Foundation, who studied cosmic rays at the South Pole Station in 1970.

=== Koerner Bluff ===
76°00′S 133°04′W. A bare rock bluff along the northwest margin of Mount Bursey. Mapped by USGS from surveys and United States Navy air photos, 1959–65. Named by US-ACAN for Roy M. Koerner, USARP glaciologist with the Byrd Station Traverse, 1962–63.

=== Heaps Rock ===
76°00′S 132°46′W. A rock exposure above Bursey Icefalls and 2 nautical miles (3.7 km; 2.3 mi) west-northwest of Hutt Peak on the Mount Bursey massif. Mapped by USGS from ground surveys and United States Navy air photos, 1959–66. Named by US-ACAN for Kenneth L. Heaps, meteorologist at South Pole Station, 1970.

=== Hutt Peak ===
76°01′S 132°39′W. A small but sharply rising snow-covered peak that rises above the general level of the central part of the Mount Bursey massif. Mapped by USGS from ground surveys and United States Navy air photos, 1959–66. Named by US-ACAN for Charles R. Hutt of the United States Coast and Geodetic Survey, a geomagnetistseismologist at South Pole Station, 1970.

=== Syrstad Rock ===
75°58′S 133°02′W. A rock outcrop below and 1 nautical mile (1.9 km; 1.2 mi) north of Koerner Bluff on the northwest slopes of Mount Bursey. Mapped by USGS from surveys and United States Navy air photos, 1959–65. Named by US-ACAN for Erik Syrstad, ionospheric physicist at South Pole Station, 1970.

=== Bursey Icefalls ===
75°59′S 132°48′W. The icefalls draining the north slope of Mount Bursey. Mapped by USGS from surveys and United States Navy air photos, 1959–65. Named by US-ACAN in association with Mount Bursey.

== Sources ==
- Alberts, Fred G., ed. (1995), Geographic Names of the Antarctic (PDF) (2 ed.), United States Board on Geographic Names This article incorporates public domain material from websites or documents of the United States Board on Geographic Names.
- Hull Glacier, USGS: United States Geological Survey
- LaMasurier, W.E.; Rex, D.C. (16 May 1991), "Tectonic significance of linear volcanic ranges in Marie Byrd Land in late Cenozoic time (Extended abstract)", Geological Evolution of Antarctica, 5th International Symposium on Antarctic Earth Sciences, 1987, Cambridge, England, Cambridge University Press, p. 531, ISBN 978-0-521-37266-4
- Mount Berlin, USGS: United States Geological Survey
- Mount Kosciusco, USGS: United States Geological Survey
- This article incorporates public domain material from websites or documents of the United States Geological Survey.
