= Mount Bursey =

Mountain in Antarctica

- Location within Antarctica

Highest point
- Elevation: 2,780 m (9,120 ft)
- Coordinates: 76°01′S 132°38′W

Geography
- Location: Marie Byrd Land, Antarctica
- Parent range: Flood Range

Geology
- Mountain type: Shield volcano
- Volcanic field: Marie Byrd Land Volcanic Province
- Last eruption: Unknown

Mount Bursey is a broad, ice-covered mountain, 2,780 metres (9,120 ft) high, which forms the eastern end of the Flood Range in Marie Byrd Land, Antarctica.

It was discovered by members of the United States Antarctic Service (USAS) on aerial flights in 1940, and named for Jacob Bursey, member of the Byrd Antarctic Expedition (1928–30) and dog-driver with the USAS party which sledged to the west end of the Flood Range in December 1940.

== Volcanism ==
Mount Bursey consists of two coalescing shield volcanoes, namely Hutt Peak and Koerner Bluff. Each shield contains a 4–5 km (2.5–3.1 mi) diameter caldera at its summit. Potassium–argon dating has indicated both shields formed during the Miocene epoch, with volcanism at Hutt Peak occurring as recently as 0.49 million years ago.

Starbuck Crater is a volcanic cone on the mountain.

== See also ==
- List of volcanoes in Antarctica
