= Parasitic cone =

Geological feature associated with some volcanos

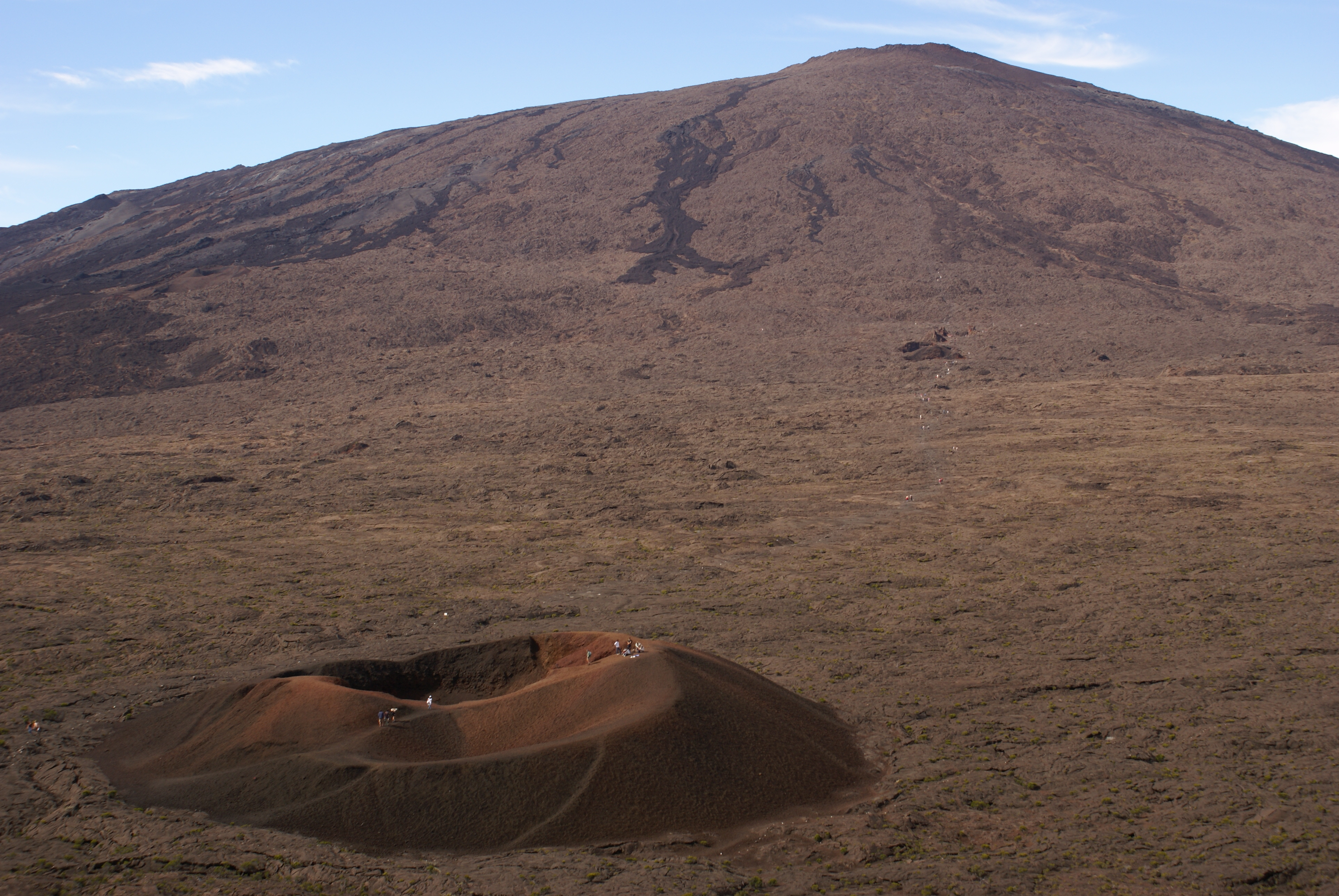
Parasitic cone (in foreground) with larger main cone in background, at Piton de la Fournaise volcano on the island of Réunion.

A parasitic cone (also adventive cone, satellite cone, satellitic cone or lateral cone) is the cone-shaped accumulation of volcanic material not part of the central vent of a volcano. It forms from eruptions from fractures on the flank of the volcano. These fractures occur because the flank of the volcano is unstable. Eventually, the fractures reach the magma chamber and generate eruptions called flank eruptions, which, in turn, produce a parasitic cone.

A parasitic cone can also be formed from a dike or sill cutting up to the surface from the central magma chamber in an area different from the central vent.

A peculiar example of multiple parasitic cones is Jeju Island in South Korea. Jeju Island features 368 "oreums" (Korean: 오름; "mount"), which lie in a roughly lateral line on either side of the island's central dormant shield volcano Hallasan.

== See also ==
- Volcanic crater
