= Hillary Coast =

Portion of the coast of Antarctica

Coordinates: 79°20′S 161°0′E

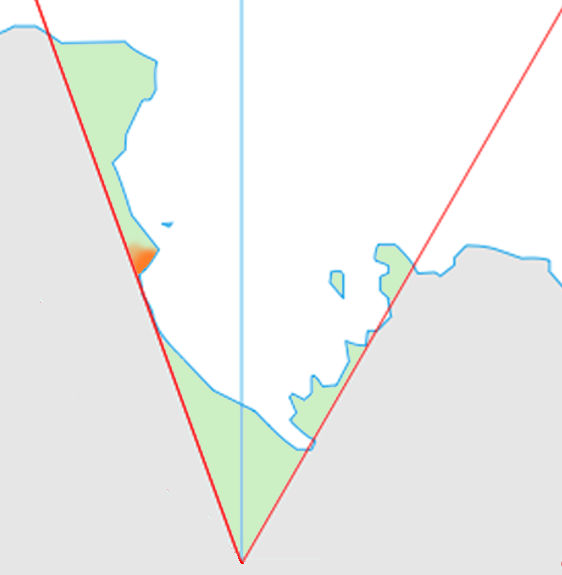
Location of the Hillary Coast (marked in orange) within the Ross Dependency.

The Hillary Coast is a portion of the coast of Antarctica along the western margin of the Ross Ice Shelf between Minna Bluff and Cape Selborne. It was named by the New Zealand Antarctic Place-Names Committee in 1961 for Sir Edmund Hillary, the leader of the New Zealand Party of the Commonwealth Trans-Antarctic Expedition, 1956–58. Various New Zealand parties carried out detailed surveys of portions of this coast and pioneered routes up Skelton Glacier and Darwin Glacier to the polar plateau.
