= Gallen Nunatak =

Nunatak in Marie Byrd Land, Antarctica

Gallen Nunatak (75°48′S 128°36′W) is a nunatak on the south side of Balchunas Pass, 1.5 nautical miles (3 km) northwest of Putzke Peak, in the McCuddin Mountains of Marie Byrd Land, Antarctica. It was mapped by the United States Geological Survey from surveys and U.S. Navy air photos, 1959–1969, and was named by the Advisory Committee on Antarctic Names for Lieutenant Kevin P. Gallen, Civil Engineer Corps, U.S. Navy, Officer-in-Charge of South Pole Station, 1971.
