= Erven Nunataks =

Nunataks in Marie Byrd Land, Antarctica

Coordinates: 75°45′S 128°10′W

The Erven Nunataks are a small nunatak group located 7.5 nautical miles (14 km) northeast of Putzke Peak in the McCuddin Mountains of Marie Byrd Land in Antarctica.They were mapped by the United States Geological Survey from surveys and U.S. Navy air photos between 1959 and 1965. They were named by the Advisory Committee on Antarctic Names for Raymond D. Erven, a United States Antarctic Research Program meteorologist at Byrd Station in 1964.
