= Mount Petras =

Mountain in Marie Byrd Land, Antarctica

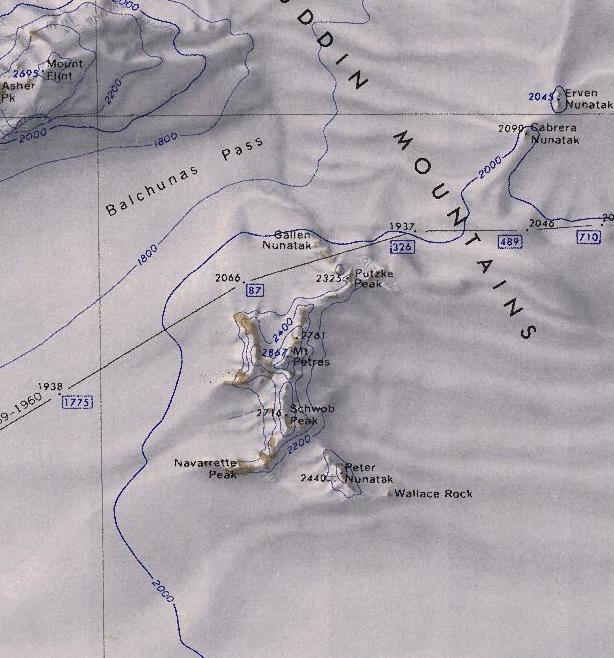
- Map of Mount Petras

Highest point
- Coordinates: 75°51′S 128°38′W

Naming
- Etymology: Named for Theodore Argyres Petras

Geography
- Location within Antarctica

Mount Petras is a mountain in Antarctica. It consists of volcanic rocks, most of Cretaceous age but there is also an Eocene-Oligocene volcanic system that may have been emplaced inside of thin ice. It is part of the Marie Byrd Land Volcanic Province and is its oldest volcano.

== Geography and geology ==
Mount Petras lies in the coastal region of Marie Byrd Land, Antarctica, and is located within the McCuddin Mountains together with Mount Flint which lies northwest of Mount Petras. The complex Mount Petras-Mount Flint-Reynolds Ridge is also known as Petras Range. It lies 200–250 kilometres (120–160 mi) inland from the Amundsen Sea coast.

It is an angular mountain consisting of rocky spurs in an area of 5 by 8 kilometres (3.1 mi × 5.0 mi), which form two ridges form a semicircular ice-filled bowl. Two other summits are 2,325 metres (7,628 ft) high Putzke Peak northeast of Mount Petras, 2,716 metres (8,911 ft) high Schwob Peak south and 2,440 metres (8,010 ft) high Peter Nunatak southeast. Other outcrops occur farther southwest at Navarrette Peak, southeast at Wallace Rock and northeast at Erven Nunataks. The existence of an explosion crater on its northern side was inferred by González-Ferran in 1972.

Both basement and volcanic rocks emerge from the West Antarctic Ice Sheet as a nunatak. The volcanic and basement rocks are separated by an unconformity at 2,700 metres (8,900 ft) elevation. The highest summit of Mount Petras lies on the western ridge at 2,867 metres (9,406 ft) elevation above sea level of which about 900 metres (3,000 ft) are above the West Antarctic Ice Sheet. Most of the volcanic rocks are hawaiite with some mugearite, while the basement is rhyodacitic and mostly consists of a Cretaceous volcanic complex that makes up the bulk of Mount Petras. The basement also includes schists, paragneisses and gneisses. The mugearite occurs in the form of a lava flow, while the hawaiites form volcaniclastic deposits as tuff breccias and lapilli tuffs. Moraine debris and talus cover exposed rocks.

Mount Petras is part of the volcanic province of Marie Byrd Land, which may be a product of a mantle plume. Other volcanoes in this province of West Antarctic volcanoes are the Ames Range, Crary Mountains, Executive Committee Range, Flood Range, Hobbs Coast nunataks, Kohler Range, Mount Murphy, Mount Siple, Mount Takahe and Mount Waesche. Some of these volcanoes are still active today. Marie Byrd Land itself is a crustal dome, with its "summit" in the area of Mount Petras; the dome was probably formed by the impingement of the mantle plume under the crust and volcanism may have spread outwards away from Mount Petras.

== Geologic history ==
Argon-argon dating has yielded ages of 36 and 29-27 million years for the volcanic rocks, making them the oldest in Marie Byrd Land. The volcano probably formed at the surface, perhaps in contact with an early Oligocene ice sheet or more likely mountain glaciers, as the rocks display evidence that the volcanic eruptions took place in shallow water, most likely meltwater, which drained away rapidly during the course of the eruption. The ice was probably thin at that time. The basement rocks have yielded Cretaceous ages and contain zircons of Devonian-Carboniferous age, with some rocks reaching ages of 1364 million years.

== Name and research history ==
The volcanic history of Mount Petras is important for reconstructing the volcanic and glacial history of Marie Byrd Land. During the late Cretaceous and Eocene-late Cenozoic, continental rifting occurred in the Ross Sea and West Antarctic Ice Sheet area. Beginning with the Oligocene, an ice sheet began to develop in Antarctica and acquired present-day dimensions during the Miocene or Pliocene.

Mount Petras was discovered during the 1939-1941 United States Antarctic Service Expedition and named after the pilot of the expedition. It was visited in 1959, 1967–1968, 1977-1978 and 1993–1994 by field expeditions. During the 20th century, Mount Petras was viewed as a volcano that had formed deep under ice on a Cenozoic marine erosion surface covering West Antarctica, which had then been deformed by tectonic uplift.
