= Balchunas Pass =

Broad mountain pass in Antarctica

Balchunas Pass (75°46′S 128°45′W) is a broad pass between Mount Flint and Mount Petras in the McCuddin Mountains of Marie Byrd Land. It was mapped by the United States Geological Survey from surveys and from U.S. Navy air photos, 1959–65, and named by the Advisory Committee on Antarctic Names for Commander Robert C. Balchunas, U.S. Navy, Executive Officer for Antarctic Support Activities during Operation Deep Freeze 1971, 1972, and 1973.
