= Seabee (disambiguation) =

A Seabee is a member of the United States Navy construction battalions (CB).

Seabee, sea-bee or sea bee may also refer to:

- Seabee (barge), a barge loading system
- Sea Bee, a dissolved Hong Kong football team
- Republic RC-3 Seabee, an amphibious sports aircraft
- 2C-B, a psychedelic phenethylamine in the 2C class of hallucinogenics

== See also ==
- Seabee Heights
- Seabee Hook
