= Alan Peterson =

Alan Peterson may refer to:

- Alan Peterson (director), American director of Fahrenhype 9/11
- Alan Peterson (meteorologist), Antarctic Automatic Weather Stations Project 1978
- Alan C. Peterson, actor appearing in films including Run and Spark

== See also ==
- Allan Pettersson (1911–1980), Swedish composer
- Allan Rune Pettersson, Swedish writer
