= Asher Peak =

Mountain peak in Marie Byrd Land, Antarctica

- Location within Antarctica

Highest point
- Elevation: 2,480 m (8,140 ft)
- Parent peak: Mount Flint
- Coordinates: 75°44′S 129°11′W

Geography
- Location: Marie Byrd Land, Antarctica
- Parent range: McCuddin Mountains

Asher Peak is a peak 2,480 metres (8,140 ft) high in the southwest portion of Mount Flint in the McCuddin Mountains of Marie Byrd Land.

It was mapped by the United States Geological Survey from surveys and from U.S. Navy air photos, 1959–65, and named by the Advisory Committee on Antarctic Names for Bill F. Asher, U.S. Navy, Senior Chief Construction Electrician at Little America V in 1958. He was Nuclear Power Plant Operator and Instrument Maintenance Supervisor with the nuclear power unit at McMurdo Station in 1969.
