= Brockton Station (Antarctica) =

- Antarctic research station
- Location in Antarctica
- Coordinates: 80°01′12″S 178°25′12″W
- Region: Ross Ice Shelf
- Established: October 1965
- Closed: February 1972

Government
  - Type: Administration
  - Body: United States Navy
- Elevation: 332 m (1,089 ft)
- Active times: Every summer

Brockton Station was an American research (weather) station in Antarctica. It was built by the Seabees and operated by the US Navy during the summer months from October 1965 to February 1972. The station was located 300 miles (500 kilometers) southeast of McMurdo Station, near the center of the Ross Ice Shelf.

The station was located at 80.02^{o}S 178.42^{o}W and the Antarctic Meteorological Research Center in collaboration with the National Climate Data Center have made the meteorological data available.

== See also ==
- List of Antarctic field camps
- Byrd Station
- Dean Cullom Smith
- Ellsworth Station
- Framheim
- Hallett Station
- List of Antarctic expeditions
- McMurdo Station
- Operation Deep Freeze
- Palmer Station
- Plateau Station
- Research stations in Antarctica
- Siple Station
- South Pole Station
