= Siple Station =

- Antarctic research station
- Location in Antarctica
- Coordinates: 75°55′00″S 83°55′00″W
- Region: Ellsworth Land
- Established: 1973
- Closed: 1988
- Named after: Paul Siple

Government
  - Type: Administration
  - Body: Stanford University STAR Lab, United States

Population
  - Siple I: Up to 4
  - Siple II: Up to 8
- Active times: All year-round

Siple Station (/ˈsaɪpəl/ SIGH-p'l) was a research station in Antarctica (75°55′00″S 83°55′00″W), established in 1973 by Stanford's STAR Lab, to perform experiments that actively probed the magnetosphere using very low frequency (VLF) waves. Its location was selected to be near the Earth's south magnetic pole, and the thick ice sheet allowed for a relatively efficient dipole antenna at VLF (very low frequency – 3 kHz range) frequencies. John Katsufrakis of Stanford University was the "father" of the station and the VLF experiment sponsored by Stanford.

There were two stations, Siple I and later Siple II, circa 1979, built above the original which was eventually crushed by the ice. The original Siple I station had a four-person winter-over crew and the later Siple II station had an eight-person winter-over crew.

The Siple II station used a 300 kW Kato square wound generator powered by a Caterpillar D353 engine to power the VLF (Jupiter) transmitter which transmitted to a receiver in Roberval, Canada. At the time, the Siple II station had the world's longest dipole antenna. Originally 12 miles (19 km) long, it was subsequently increased to 24 miles (39 km) and then a second 24-mile (39 km) antenna running at 90 degrees was added, resulting in a total antenna length of approximately 50 miles and allowing for phased VLF transmissions. Utah State also conducted a high-frequency radar experiment for a few years at the Siple II station.

The Siple II station's house power was provided by two 110 kW generators (one active, one standby) powered by 3306 Caterpillar engines. The Siple II building complex was a metal Wonder Arch structure approximately 280 ft (85 m) long, 44 ft (13 m) wide and 24 ft (7.3 m) tall. During winter-over operation the facility stored a maximum of approximately 80,000 US gallons (300,000 L; 67,000 imp gal) of DFA (Diesel Fuel Arctic) in three 25,000-US-gallon (95,000 L; 21,000 imp gal) fuel bladders.

Siple Station was named after Paul Siple, who, as a Boy Scout, was a member of two Byrd expeditions and other Antarctic explorations. The station was closed in 1988 following completion of the program.

== See also ==
- List of Antarctic field camps
- List of Antarctic research stations
- Brockton Station
- Byrd Station
- Ellsworth Station
- Hallett Station
- Little America V
- McMurdo Station
- Operation Deep Freeze
- Palmer Station
- Plateau Station
- South Pole Station
