= Automatic weather station =

Meteorological instrument

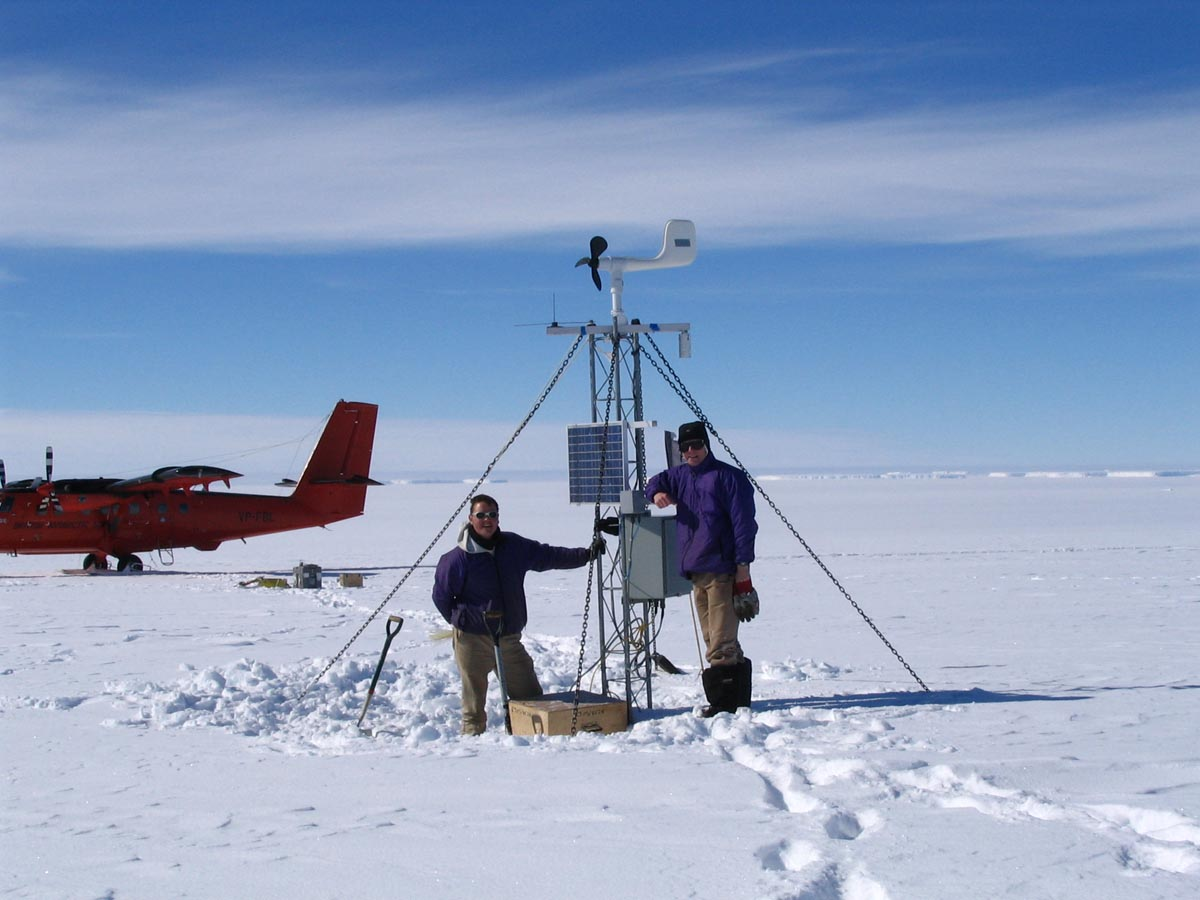
An Antarctic Automatic Weather Stations Project AWS in Antarctica

An automatic weather station (AWS) is an automated version of the traditional weather station, either to save human labor or to enable measurements from remote areas. An AWS will typically consist of a weather-proof enclosure containing the data logger, rechargeable battery, telemetry (optional) and the meteorological sensors, with an attached solar panel or wind turbine, mounted upon a mast. The specific configuration may vary due to the purpose of the system. The system may report in near real time via the Argos System, LoRa and the Global Telecommunications System, or save the data for later recovery.

In the past, automatic weather stations were often placed where electricity and communication lines were available. Nowadays, the solar panel, wind turbine and mobile phone technology have made it possible to have wireless stations that are not connected to the electrical grid or hardline telecommunications network.

== Sensors ==
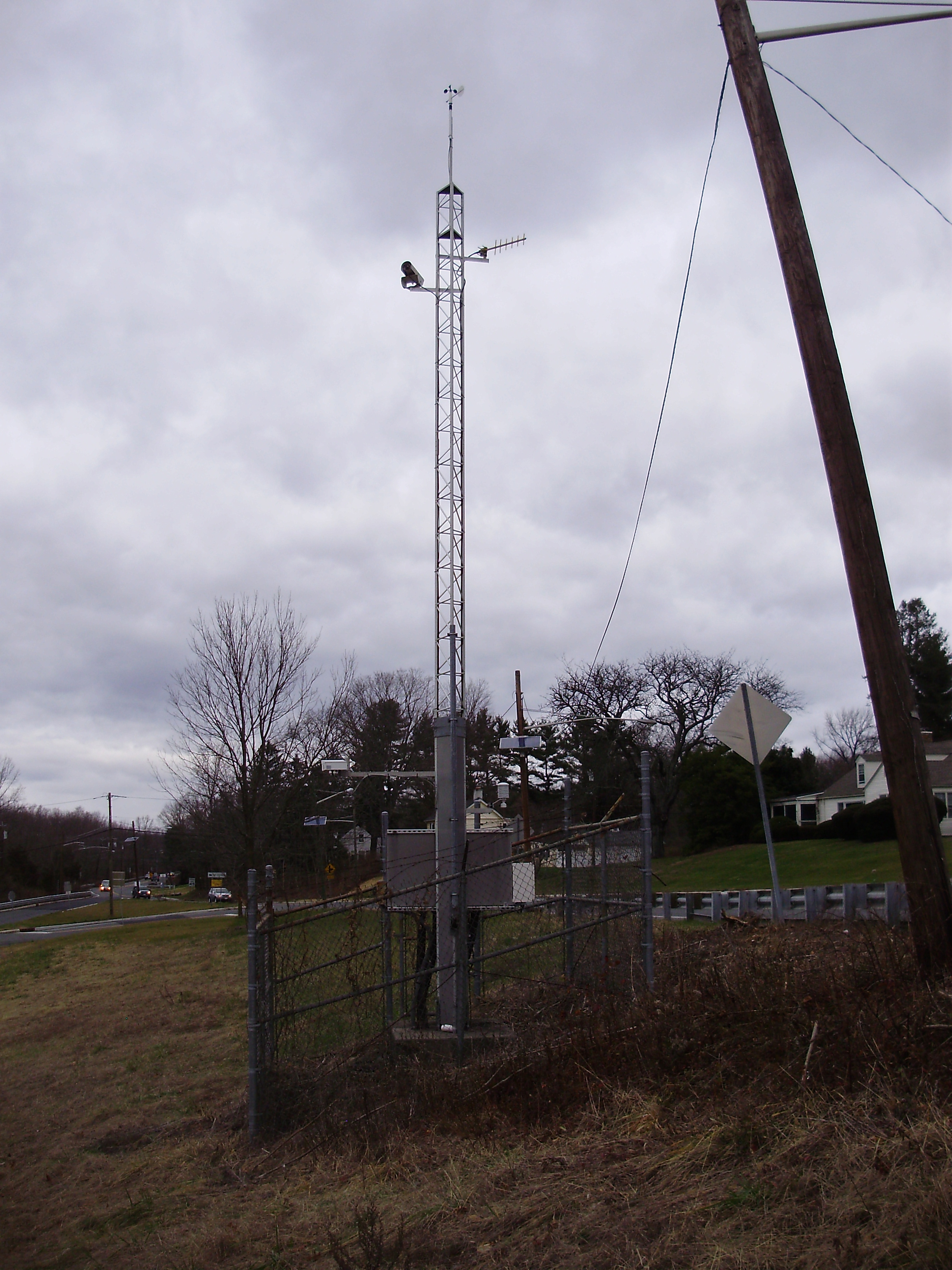
An RWIS station

Most automatic weather stations have

- Thermometer for measuring temperature
- Anemometer for measuring wind speed
- Wind vane for measuring wind direction
- Hygrometer for measuring humidity
- Barometer for measuring atmospheric pressure

Some stations can also have

- Ceilometer for measuring cloud height
- Present weather sensor and/or visibility sensor
- Rain gauge for measuring liquid-equivalent precipitation
- Ultrasonic snow depth sensor for measuring depth of snow
- Pyranometer for measuring solar radiation

Unlike manual weather stations, automated airport weather stations cannot report the class and amount of clouds. Also, precipitation measurements are difficult, especially for snow, as the gauge must empty itself between observations. For present weather, all phenomena that do not touch the sensor, such as fog patches, remain unobserved. The change from manual observations to automatic weather stations is a major non-climatic change in the climate record. The change in instrumentation, enclosure and location can lead to a jump in, for example, the measured temperature or precipitation values, which can lead to erroneous estimates of climate trends. This change, and related non-climatic changes, have to be removed by homogenization.

== Data-logger ==
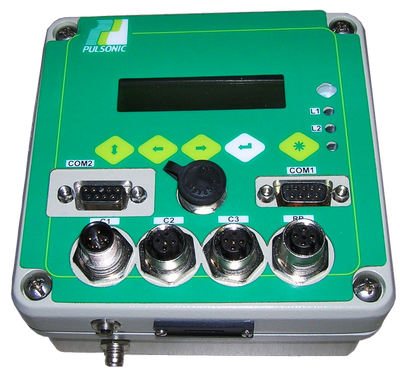
Data-logger for automatic weather station

The data-logger is the heart of the Automatic Weather Station.
In high quality weather stations, the data-logger may be designed by the supplier to be the perfect solution for a particular meteorological client. Indeed, usually data-loggers found in the market don't fit the requirement in terms of power consumption, inputs, communication, protection against animals (ants, rats, etc.), humidity, salty air, sand, etc.
The main functions of a data-logger are:

- Measurement: the data-logger collects the information from every sensor and archives it.
- Calculation: the data-logger processes most of the meteorological data for the users (avg, min, max...).
- Data storage: the data-logger saves all the data either on its own memory or on uSD memory card.
- Power supply: the data-logger manages the power supply of the Automatic Weather Station, using a solar panel for instance.
- Communication: the data-logger manages the communication protocols with the remote server. The different communication protocols are usually GSM, GPRS, RTC, WiFi, uSD, and RS-232.

== Enclosures ==
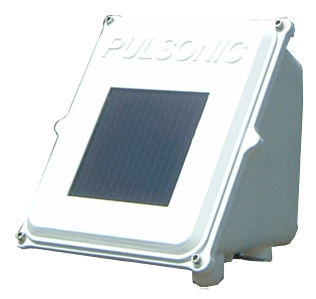
Enclosure with solar panel for data-logger of weather station

Enclosures used with automatic weather stations are typically weather proof fiberglass, ABS or stainless steel, With ABS being the cheapest, cast aluminium paint or stainless steel the most durable and fiberglass being a compromise.

== Power supply ==
The main power source for an automatic weather station depends on its usage. Many stations with lower power equipment usually use one or more solar panels connected in parallel with a regulator and one or more rechargeable batteries. As a rule of thumb, solar output is at its optimum for only 5 hours each day. As such, mounting angle and position are vital. In the Northern Hemisphere, the solar panel would be mounted facing south and vice versa for the Southern Hemisphere. The output from the solar panels may be supplemented by a wind turbine to provide power during periods of poor sunlight, or by direct connection to the local electrical grid. Most automated airport weather stations are connected to the commercial power grid due to the higher power needs of the ceilometer and present weather sensors, which are active sensors and emit energy directly into the environment.

== Mast ==
The standard mast heights used with automatic weather stations are 2, 3, 10 and 30 meters. Other sizes are available, but typically these sizes have been used as standards for differing applications.

- The 2-meter (6.6 ft) mast is used for the measurement of parameters that affect a human subject. The mast height is referenced to head height.
- The 3-meter (9.8 ft) mast is used for the measurement of parameters that affect crops (such as wheat, sugar cane etc.) The mast height is referenced to crop top.
- The 10-meter (33 ft) mast is used for the measurement of parameters without interference from objects such as trees, buildings or other obstructions. Typically the most important weather parameter measured at this height is wind speed and direction.
- The 30-meter (98 ft) mast is used for the measurement of parameters over stratified distances for the purposes of data modelling. A common application is to take measurements of wind, humidity and temperature at 30, 10, and 2 meters. Other sensors are mounted around the 2 meter or lower height.

== Strengths and weaknesses ==
One of the main advantages of an automatic weather station is that it can provide accurate and reliable weather data in remote, inaccessible or hazardous locations. AWS boasts its capability in terms of portability, low-assembly cost, operating autonomy, and requiring relatively easy maintenance. The AWS can be programmed to alert authorities in case of severe weather events.

The accuracy of automatic weather stations varies, largely due to the stations being automated. This causes issues concerning the placement of the station, the margin of error from the installed sensors, frequency of maintenance and calibration errors, much more apparent when there is no involvement from actual professionals from the meteorological field.

== See also ==
- Remote Automated Weather Station
- Automated airport weather station
- Personal weather station
- Mesonet
- Cooperative Observer
