= Cape Hallett =

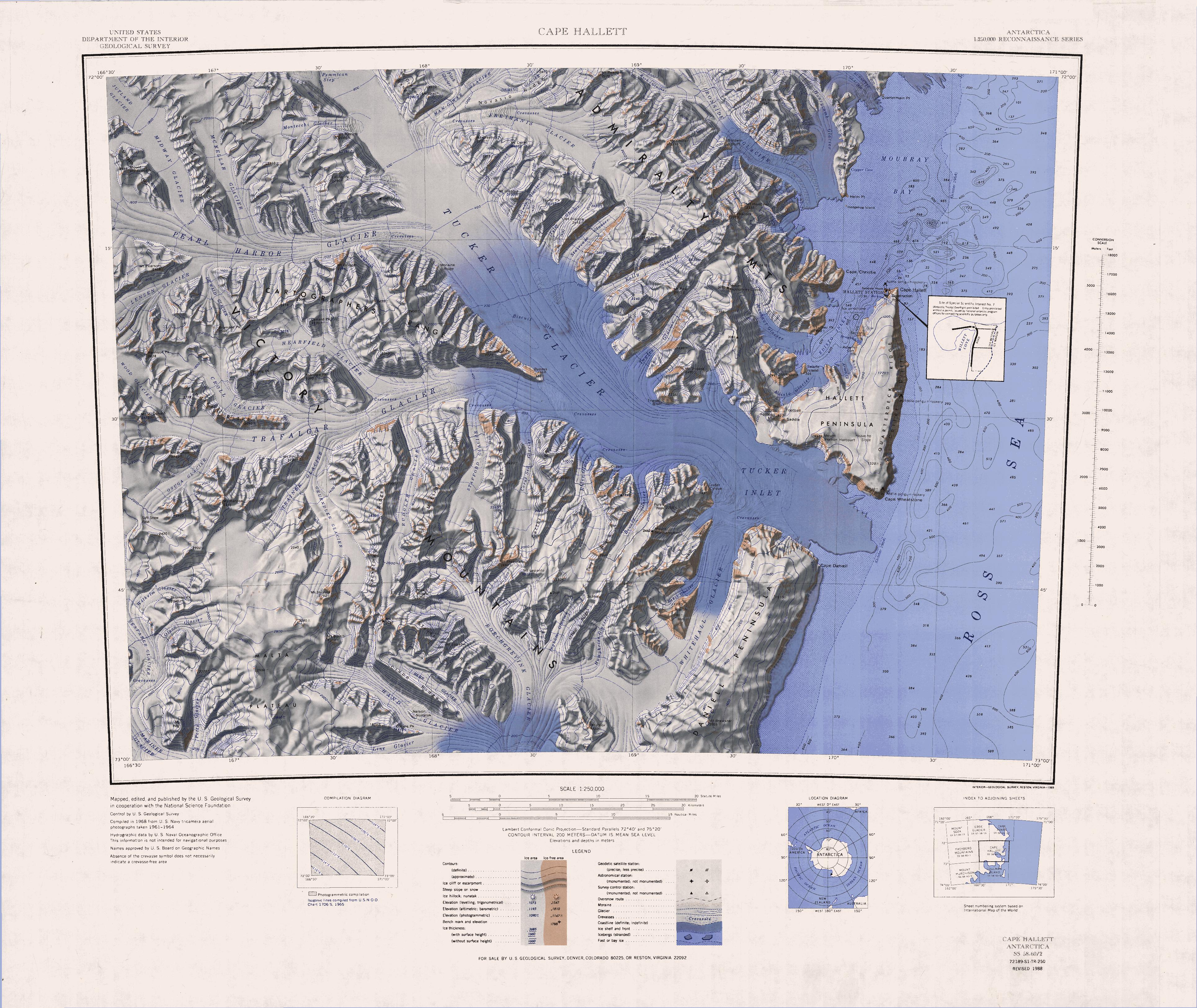
Topographic map of the Cape Hallett area

Cape Hallett is a snow-free area (Antarctic oasis) on the northern tip of the Hallett Peninsula on the Ross Sea coast of Victoria Land, East Antarctica. Cape Adare lies 100 km (62 mi) to the north. Cape Hallet was the site of a former scientific base built for the International Geophysical Year, and also the site of a fatal 1957 aviation accident; a transport aircraft on its way to McMurdo Station crashed into a mountain.

== History ==
In 1956, during Operation Deep Freeze II, USS Arneb was damaged by an ice floe at Cape Hallett.

On 16 October 1958, a Douglas C-124C Globemaster II (52-1017) of the USAF crashed into a 3200-foot mountain near Cape Hallett Bay while maneuvering, killing 7 of the 13 occupants. The Globemaster was on an airdrop flight from Christchurch to McMurdo Station and other navigational errors had occurred prior to the crash.

=== Hallett Station ===
Hallett Station
- Antarctic research station
- Location in Antarctica
- Coordinates: 72°19′06″S 170°12′35″E
- Established: 1956
- Dismantled: 1973

Government
  - Type: Administration
  - Body: IGY, United States, New Zealand
- Active times: All year-round until 1964, every summer until 1975

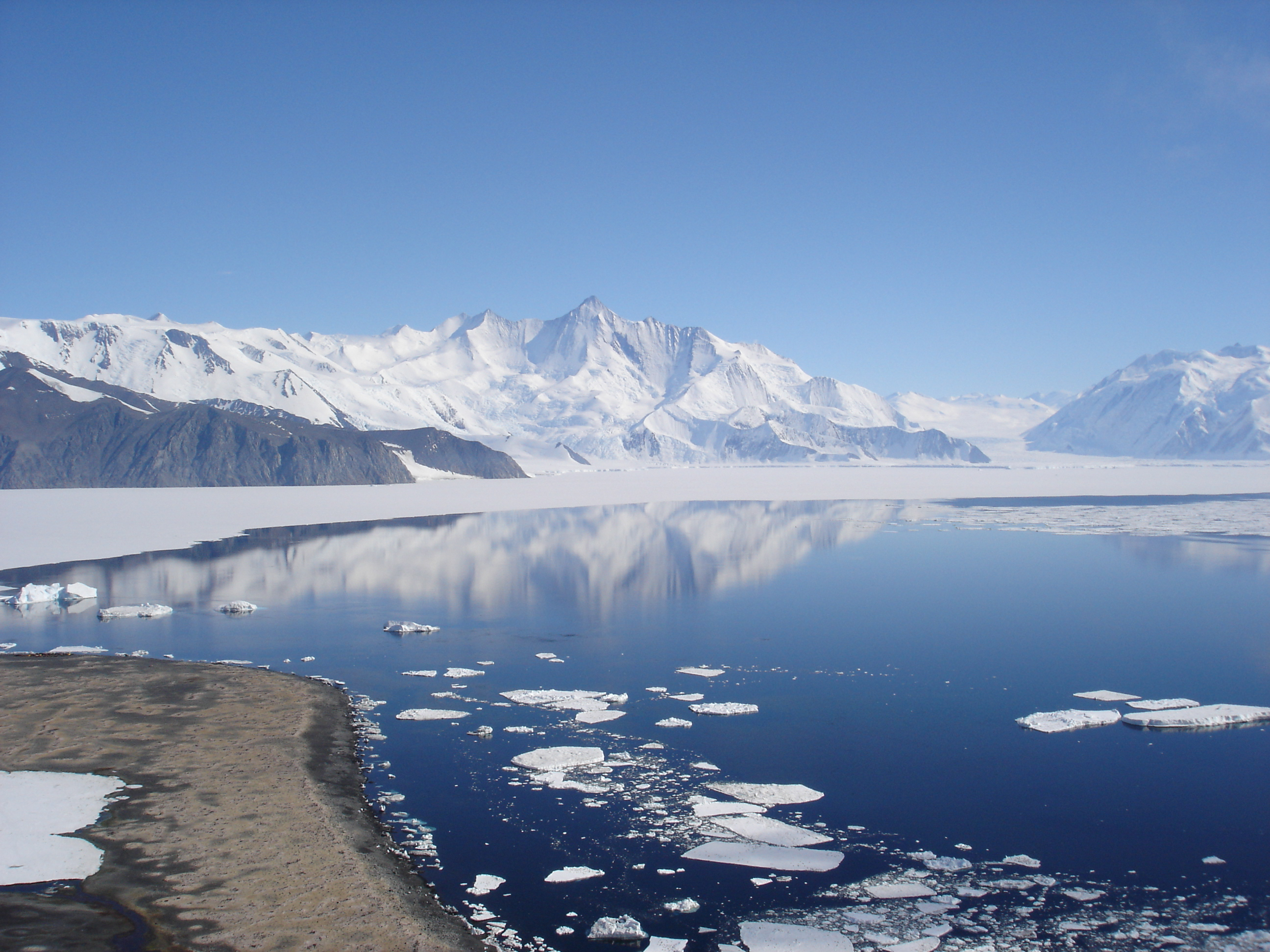
Mount Herschel (3,335 m (10,942 ft)) in the Admiralty Mountains as seen from Cape Hallett

The cape was the location of a joint scientific base, Hallett Station, between the United States and New Zealand during the International Geophysical Year of 1957. New Zealander Robert B. Thomson was scientific leader at the station in 1960. He later became officer-in-charge at Wilkes Station in 1962, and deputy leader at Scott Base in 1963-64. Thomson Peak, in the Mirabito Range, Victoria Land, was named after him.

Hallett Station was manned permanently until 1964, when there was a major fire, and was then used as a summer only base until 1973. A project has been started to remediate the site by removing hazardous materials such as fuel, and oil stored in several large tanks.

Hallett Station was one of seven bases that the United States built for the IGY, which also included McMurdo, Wilkes, Admundsen-Scott, Ellsworth, Byrd, and Little America. Of these, only McMurdo and Admundsen-Scott are still being operated by 2022.

== Antarctic Specially Protected Area ==
An area of 74 ha is protected under the Antarctic Treaty System as Antarctic Specially Protected Area (ASPA) No.106 because it contains habitats with a rich and diverse range of plant communities that are the most extensive and representative examples known at the northern end of the latitudinal gradient of Victoria Land and the Ross Sea. Surveys have recorded 18 species of lichens and five species of mosses, dominated by Bryum subrotundifolium. Animals found at the site include, as well as four species of mites and three of springtails, breeding colonies of south polar skuas and Adélie penguins.

=== Adélie penguin colony ===
A large Adélie penguin colony occupies Seabee Hook, on the west side of Hallett Peninsula between Moubray Bay and Edisto Inlet. The history of human impact on the colony through the occupation of Hallett Station, and the subsequent closure of the station, together with the availability of reliable historical data on colony population size, make the site unique and ideal for the study of impacts on, and recovery of, the colony after substantial ecosystem disturbance.

== See also ==
- List of Antarctic field camps
- Brockton Station
- Byrd Station
- Ellsworth Station
- Little America V
- McMurdo Station
- Operation Deep Freeze
- Palmer Station
- Plateau Station
- Siple Station
- South Pole Station
