= Jacobs Wind =

Renewable energy company specializing in wind power

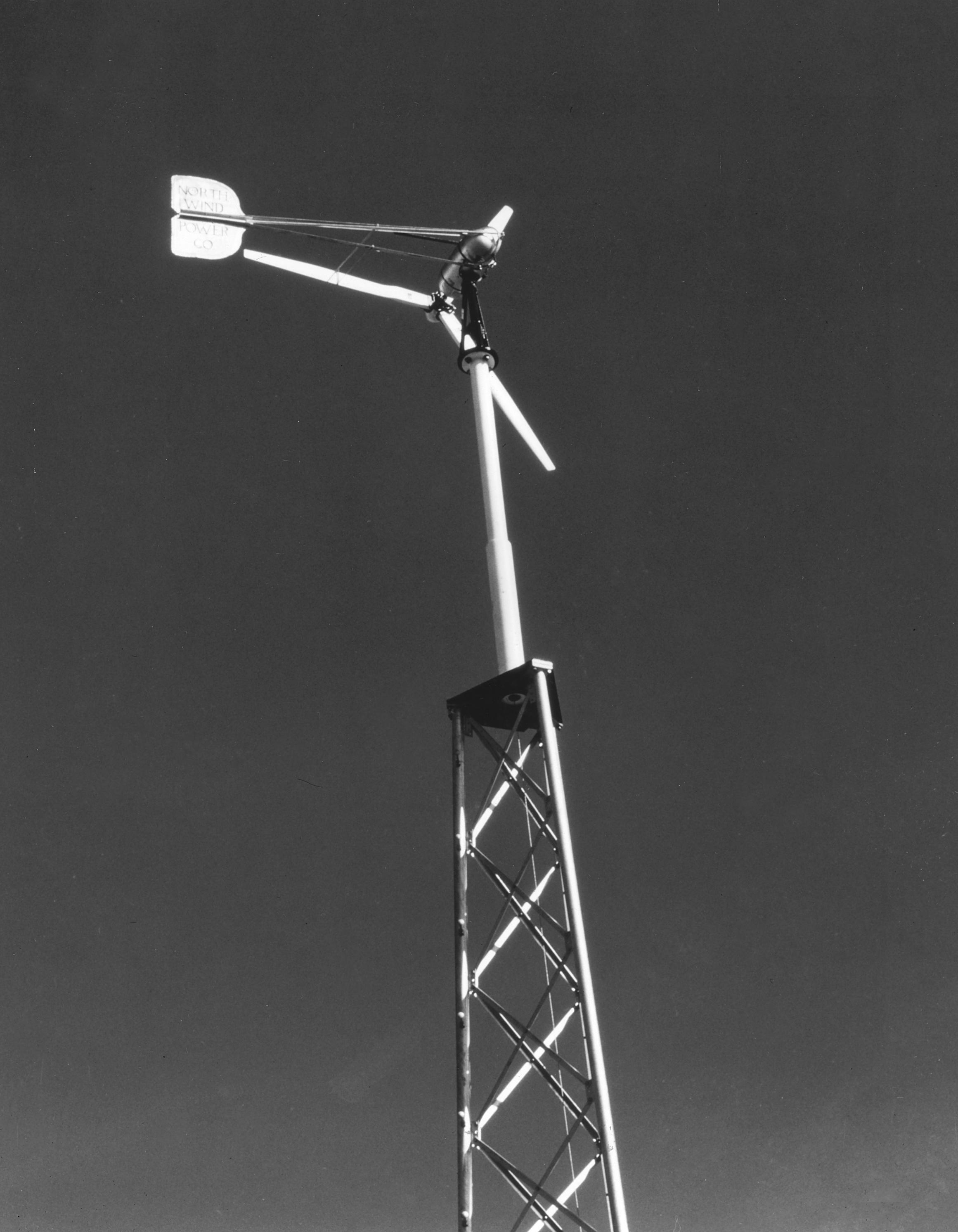
Jacobs wind turbine (c. 1977)

Jacobs Wind Electric Co. Inc. is a renewable energy company currently headquartered in the Carlson Center, Minnetonka, United States. The company was founded by Marcellus and Joseph Jacobs after their wind electric system, installed on their family's Montana Ranch in 1922, garnered local interest, leading to its expansion.

Marcellus & Joe relocated the company to Minneapolis in 1931 to commence the production of enhanced wind/engine distributed energy systems, which were distributed in the U.S., Canada, Mexico, and beyond North America. One of Jacobs' early machines was transported to Antarctica by Richard Evelyn Byrd and installed at Byrd's 'Little America' in 1933, operating until 1955.

In the 1980s, Jacobs Wind Electric Co. collaborated with Control Data to develop a new series of wind energy systems capable of generating 10-20 kW of electricity. Over 1,500 of these larger systems were manufactured between 1980 and 1985, with many integrated into the grid. Numerous units were deployed in pioneering wind farms in Hawaii and California.

Jacobs wind systems were also connected to Rural Electric Cooperative (REC) grids in Minnesota from 1981 onwards. Many of these systems remain operational, contributing renewable wind power for sale to REC grids (AG-WATTS).
