= Antarctic Automatic Weather Stations Project =

Meteorological research project

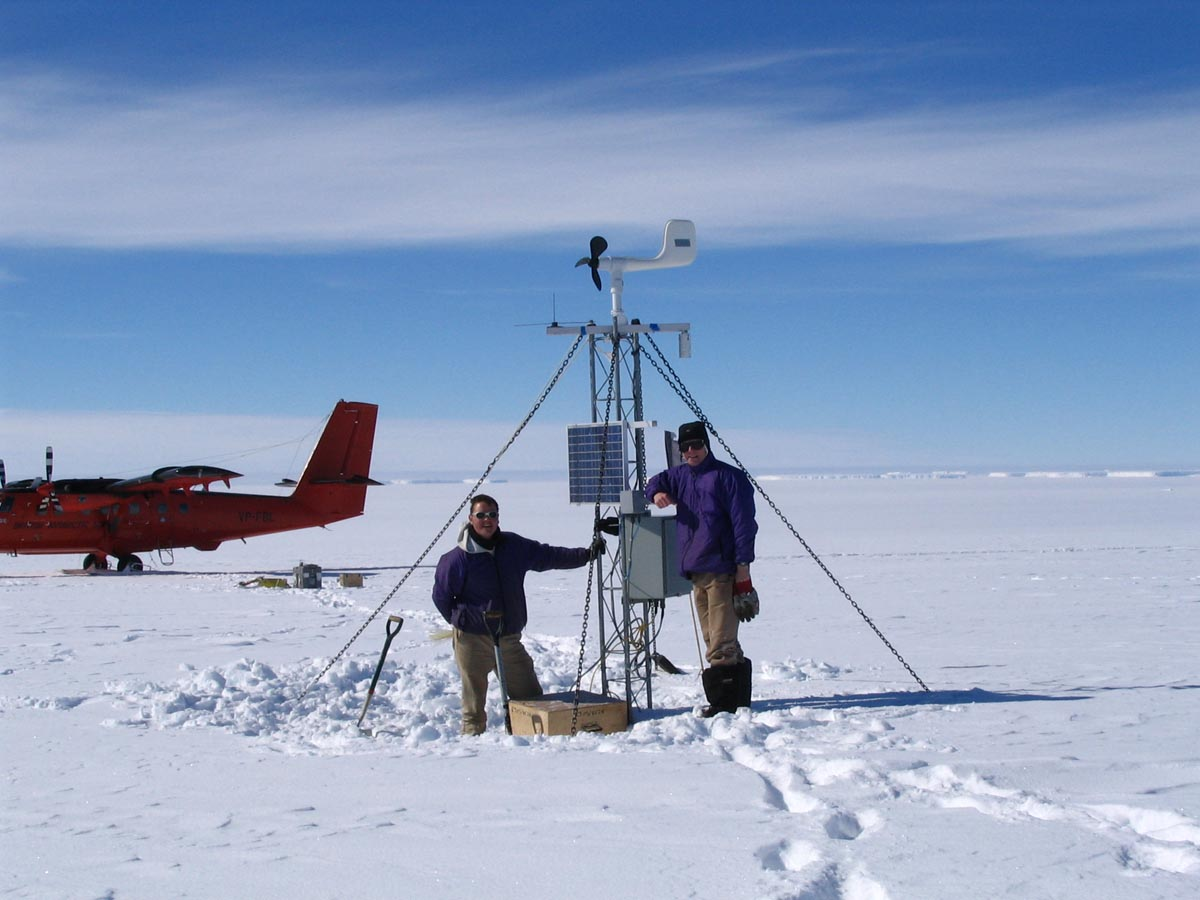
rothara weather station

The Antarctic Automatic Weather Station (AWS) Project is an Antarctic research program at the Space Science and Engineering Center at the University of Wisconsin–Madison that is funded by the Office of Polar Programs at the National Science Foundation (NSF). The AWS project was started in 1980 by UW-Madison atmospheric sciences Professor Charles R. Stearns.

Currently, the UW-Madison AWS project operates and maintains 57 automated weather stations in Antarctica, more than half of all stations currently known to be operating on the continent.

Automated weather stations have multiple different sensors that measure temperature, wind speed and direction, relative humidity, and pressure.

== Origins ==
In 1978, Professor Alan Peterson at the Radio Sciences Lab at Stanford University developed the original Antarctic automated weather station. Key operational aspects to the original AWS were low voltage circuitry and the ARGOS satellite communications system.

The ARGOS satellite communication system transmits observational data from every AWS to polar-orbiting weather satellites and then to mid-latitude receiving stations for analysis and archiving.

== Research ==
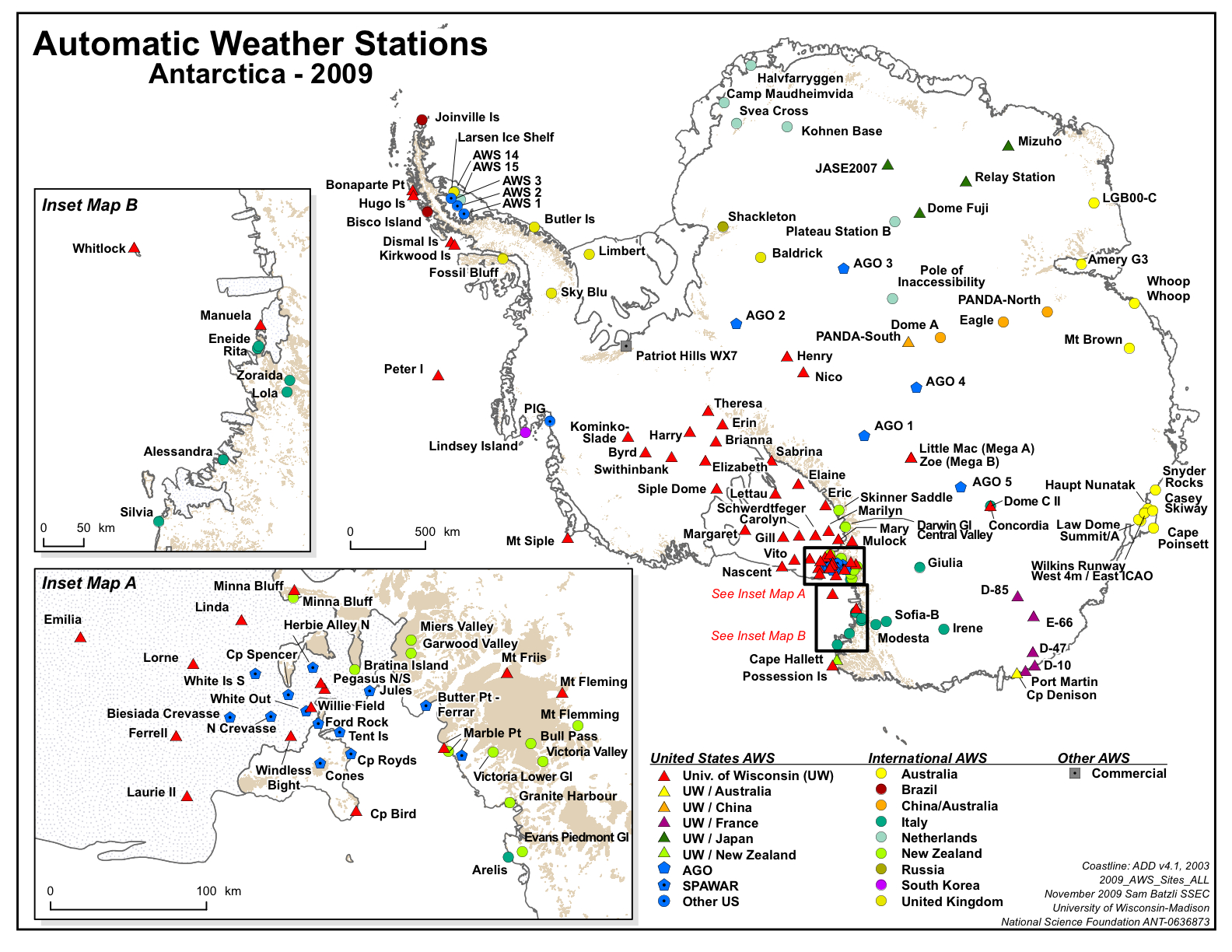
Locations of all known installed Antarctic automatic weather stations as of 2009

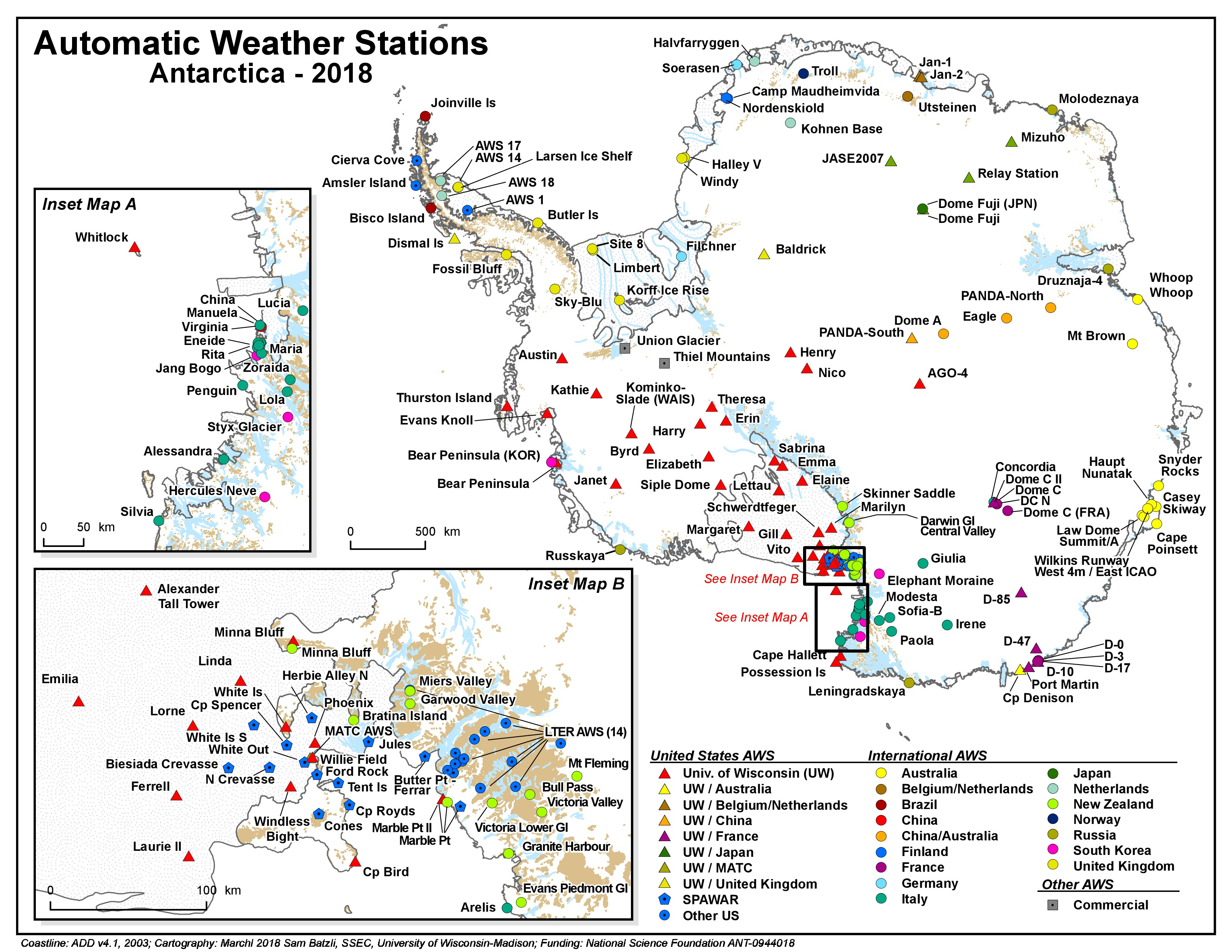
Current locations of all known installed Antarctic automatic weather stations

Data from the UW-Madison Antarctic AWS program has been used for many research studies including, but not limited to: boundary layer meteorology studies near the South Pole, Katabatic wind studies at Reeves Glacier and the Adelie Coast, Long Term Ecological Research along the Antarctic Peninsula, and Barrier wind flow studies along the Transantarctic Mountains and the Antarctic Peninsula. Additional studies include flight forecasting and long-term climatology studies at Dome C in East Antarctica and historic Byrd Station in West Antarctica.

Although the primary purpose of the AWS station project was intended to collect data on current meteorological conditions, the archive of data, beginning in 1980, has allowed for some recent climatological usage of the data.

UW-Madison's AWS network has also been in supporting roles for other domestic and international research institutions for glaciological studies, tabular icebergs, and operational weather forecasting.

== See also ==
- Antarctic Meteorological Research Center
- Climate of Antarctica
- United States Antarctic Program
- Automatic weather station
