= Peter Nunatak =

Nunatak in Marie Byrd Land, Antarctica

Peter Nunatak (75°55′S 128°33′W) is a prominent, conical nunatak (2,440 m) standing 3.5 nautical miles (6 km) southeast of Mount Petras at the south extremity of the McCuddin Mountains, in Marie Byrd Land. Mapped by United States Geological Survey (USGS) from surveys and U.S. Navy air photos, 1959–65. Named by Advisory Committee on Antarctic Names (US-ACAN) for Captain Peter J. Anderson, United States Air Force (USAF), Technical Editor, History and Research Division, U.S. Naval Support Force, Antarctica, during Operation Deep Freeze 1971 and 1972.
