= Ellsworth Station =

Ellsworth Station Estación científica Ellsworth Base Ellsworth (until 1959)
- Antarctic research station
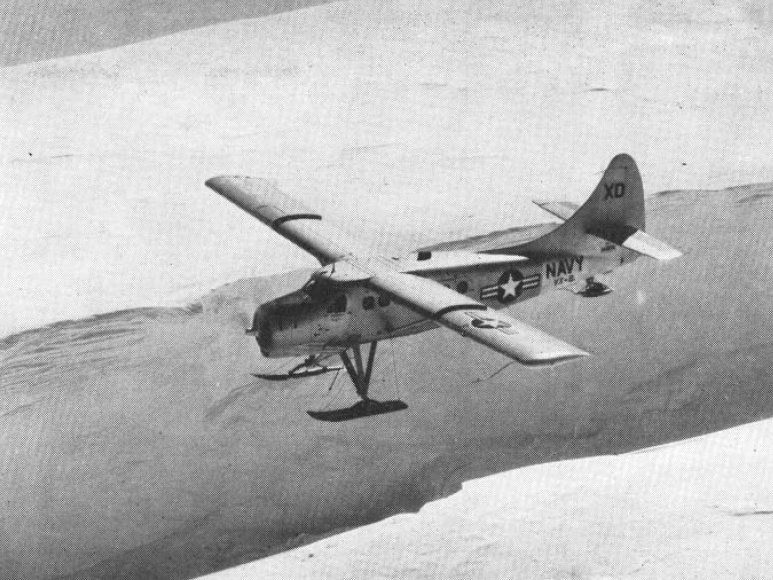
- A U.S. Navy de Havilland Canada UC-1 Otter of Antarctic Development Squadron 6 (VXE-6) in flight over a large open crevasse near the station in 1958

- Last location in Antarctica
- Coordinates: 77°43′00″S 41°02′00″W
- Region: Filchner–Ronne Ice Shelf
- Location: Near Gould Bay
- Established: 11 February 1957
- Transferred: 17 January 1959
- Removed: 30 December 1962
- Named after: Lincoln Ellsworth

Government
  - Type: Administration
  - Body: Instituto Antártico Argentino
- Elevation: 42 m (138 ft)

Population
  - Summer: 40
  - Winter: 40
- Time zone: UTC-3 (ART)
- Active times: All year-round
- Activities: List: Meteorology; Astronomy; Seismography; Riometry
- Facilities: List: Main house; Personnel houses; Airstrip; Radio station; Power plant; Laboratory; Deposits

Ellsworth Scientific Station (Spanish: Estación Científica Ellsworth, or simply Estación Ellsworth or Base Ellsworth) was a permanent, all year-round originally American, then Argentine Antarctic scientific research station named after American polar explorer Lincoln Ellsworth. It was located on Gould Bay, on the Filchner Ice Shelf.

It was shut down in 1962 over safety concerns due to it being built on increasingly unstable ice, which produced fast deterioration of its superstructures and endangered both personnel and equipment.

== History ==
Ellsworth Station was built by United States Navy Seabees under the command of Captain Finn Ronne, with the support of the icebreakers USS Staten Island and USS Wyandot, captained by Francis Gambacorta. The originally planned site for the station was Cape Adams, but when the terrain proved impractical due to huge ice cliffs, an alternate location on Gould Bay was selected, on the western coast of the Weddell Sea over the Filchner Ice Shelf, and close to the Argentinean Belgrano I Base.

Part of the scheduled agenda for the International Geophysical Year, Ellsworth Station was commissioned on 11 February 1957 and less than two years later, on 17 January 1959, was handed over to the Argentinean Antarctic Institute. Along with the handover, the United States government gave all the buildings, facilities, and existing food supplies while Argentina provided the logistical and administrative services necessary for the continued operation of the station. It was agreed that scientists of both countries would work together at the place in technical studies and scientific research.

Ellsworth Station was one of seven bases that the United States built for the IGY, which also included McMurdo, Hallett (with New Zealand), Wilkes, Admundsen-Scott (South Pole Station), Byrd, and Little America.

On 31 December 1959, the Argentinean icebreaker ARA General San Martín was heading to Ellsworth Station to exchange personnel deliver and consumables when it received a SOS signal from the Norwegian–South African exploration ship Polarbjorn, which had gotten stuck in ice. The Argentineans managed to set the ship free so it could follow with its planned route along the coastline, However, the General San Martín was later unable to reach its own primary goal—located on the deepest recess of the Weddell Sea—due to unusually thick pack ice on the target area.

On 6 January 1962, Frigate Captain Hermes Quijada of the Argentine Naval Aviation, leading a two-plane flight of Douglas C-47s, made a stopover at Ellsworth Base before continuing to the South Pole. He became the pilot of the first airplane that had taken off from the Americas, and then landed at the South Pole.

Feasibility of the station came into question when structural problems caused by the unstable ice had the base half-sunken during most of the spring. To protect personnel and equipment, Ellsworth base was closed and all of its staff and equipment were evacuated on 30 December 1962, during the 1962–63 antarctic summer campaign. It continued to be inspected periodically by Argentinean exploration teams: it was eventually covered by snow and ice. The Filchner Shelf sector where it was located as split off a giant iceberg, and then it drifted through the Southern Ocean, where the base's remains have been lost at sea.

== Description ==
The original facilities at Ellsworth Station could house over 40 people.

=== Scientific activities ===
During its operational days a number of experiments and observations were carried out at Ellsworth, involving ionospheric riometry observations; biology; human physiology; and surface and high-atmosphere meteorology, including radiation and carbon dioxide measurements.

There was also active research involving glaciology at the Filchner Ice Shelf, which was explored by several expeditions launched from the station. Some of these patrols reached the West Crevice on the huge barrier, completing the Ellsworth–Belgrano triangulation.

== Climate ==
The area is a passage of weather fronts directed towards the north: although they do not precipitate, they do produce strong winds exceeding 200 km/h (120 mph) which radically lower the apparent temperature.

Climate data for Ellsworth Station
Month	Jan	Feb	Mar	Apr	May	Jun	Jul	Aug	Sep	Oct	Nov	Dec	Year
Mean daily maximum °C (°F)	−6 (22)	−13 (9)	−19 (−3)	−23 (−10)	−24 (−11)	−28 (−19)	−29 (−21)	−29 (−21)	−27 (−16)	−19 (−2)	−12 (11)	−6 (22)	−19 (−2)
Mean daily minimum °C (°F)	−11 (12)	−19 (−2)	−27 (−16)	−32 (−25)	−32 (−26)	−36 (−32)	−37 (−35)	−37 (−35)	−34 (−30)	−26 (−15)	−18 (−1)	−11 (13)	−26 (−15)
Average precipitation mm (inches)	7.6 (0.3)	5.1 (0.2)	7.6 (0.3)	15 (0.6)	5.1 (0.2)	5.1 (0.2)	5.1 (0.2)	5.1 (0.2)	7.6 (0.3)	10 (0.4)	13 (0.5)	5.1 (0.2)	86 (3.4)
Source: Weatherbase

== See also ==
- Argentine Antarctica
- List of Antarctic research stations
- List of Antarctic field camps
- McMurdo Station
- South Pole Station
- Byrd Station
- Palmer Station
- Siple Station
- Operation Deep Freeze
- Brockton Station
- Eights Station
- Plateau Station
- Hallett Station
- Little America V
