= Wallace Rock =

Rock outcrop in Antarctica

Wallace Rock (75°55′S 128°27′W) is a rock outcrop 1 nautical mile (1.9 km) east of Peter Nunatak at the southeast extremity of the McCuddin Mountains, Marie Byrd Land. Mapped by United States Geological Survey (USGS) from surveys and U.S. Navy air photos, 1959–69. Named by Advisory Committee on Antarctic Names (US-ACAN) for James W. Wallace, UTC, U.S. Navy, Chief Utilitiesman at South Pole Station in 1965 and 1969.
