= Little America (exploration base) =

Little America I, II, III, IV and V
- Antarctic research station
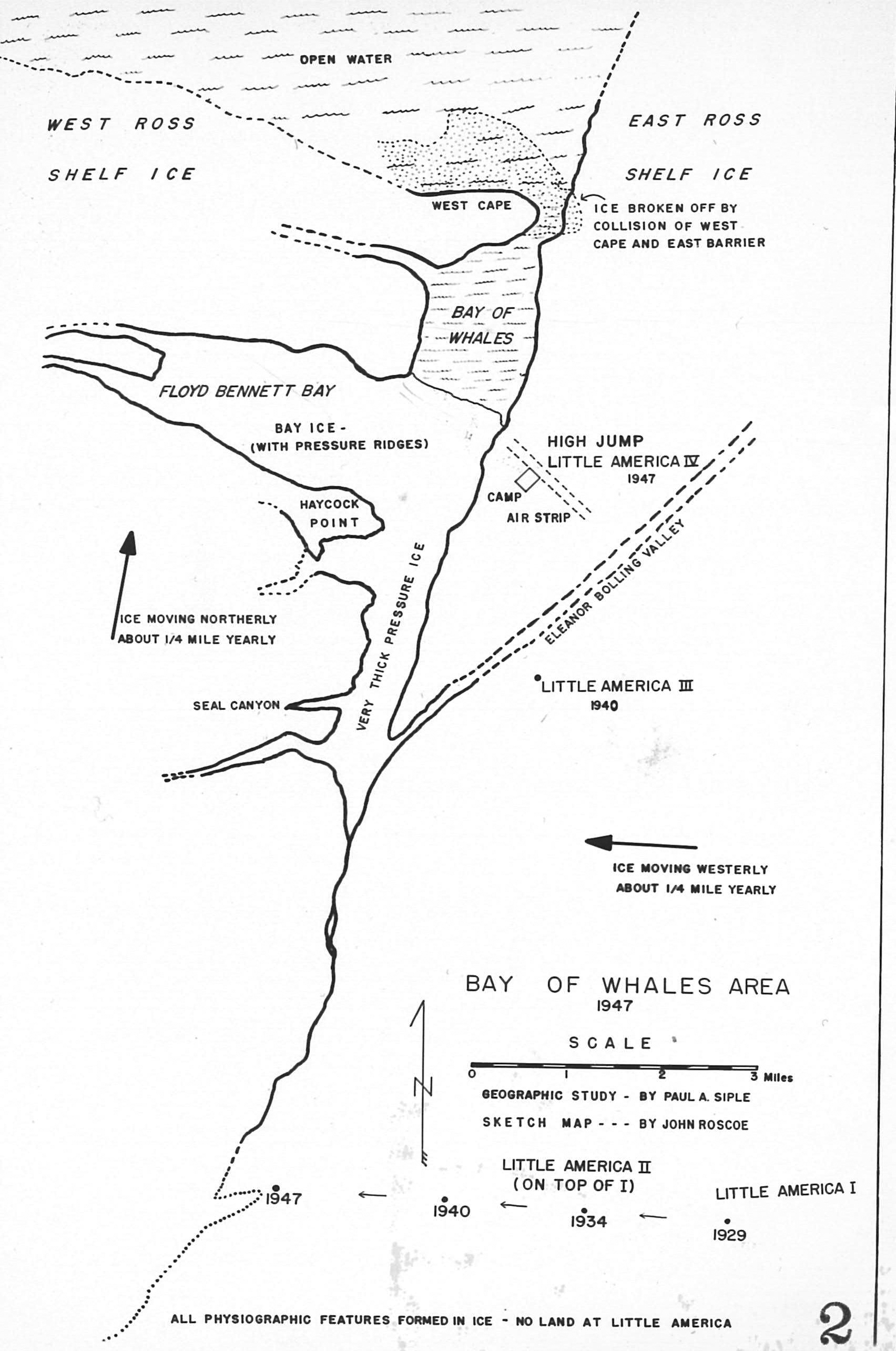
- Locations of Little America I, II, III, and IV near Bay of Whales
- Region: Ross Ice Shelf

Government
  - Type: Administration
  - Body: USN, United States
- Active times: Temporary

Little America was a series of Antarctic exploration bases from 1929 to 1958, located on the Ross Ice Shelf, south of the Bay of Whales. They were built on ice that moves very slowly; the relative location on the ice sheet has moved and eventually breaks off into an iceberg. The geographic location has new ice that has shifted to this location and is technically over the open water.

The coordinates are approximate.

== Little America I ==
Little America I
- Location in Antarctica
- Coordinates: 78°40′00″S 164°03′00″W
- Location: Near Bay of Whales
- Established: January 1929
- Abandoned: 1930

The first base in the series was established in January 1929 by Richard Byrd, and was abandoned in 1930. This was where the film With Byrd at the South Pole (1930), about Byrd's trip to the South Pole, was filmed.

== Little America II ==
Little America II
- Byrd Antarctic Expedition II cover, Jan. 30, 1935
- Interactive map of Little America II
- Coordinates: 78°40′00″S 164°03′00″W
- Location: Near Bay of Whales
- Established: 1934
- Closed: 1935

Little America II was established in 1934, some thirty feet (ten meters) above the site of the original base, with some of the original base accessed via tunnel. This base was briefly set adrift in 1934, but the iceberg fused to the main glacier.

During the 1934–1935 expedition, many souvenir letters were sent from Little America, using a commemorative postage stamp issued by the U.S. government. The souvenir cancellation operations were conducted under extremely difficult conditions.

Little America established the first successful radio broadcasting from Antarctica, making regular broadcasts that could be picked up by household radio sets in the United States, more than 11,000 miles (18,000 kilometers) away around the Earth's curvature.

In a later expedition to Antarctica, Byrd's expedition spotted Little America's towers still standing, including the Jacobs Wind plant installed in 1933.

== Little America III ==
Little America III
- Interactive map of Little America III
- Coordinates: 78°35′00″S 163°52′00″W
- Location: Near Bay of Whales
- Established: 1940
- Abandoned: 1940

Little America III was established for the 1940–1941 season, some six miles (ten kilometers) to the north.

In 1940 a huge exploration vehicle, the Antarctic Snow Cruiser, was brought to Little America III. Unfortunately, the vehicle was found to have a number of design and technical weaknesses and was little used. Abandoned, it became buried in the snow. It was last rediscovered in 1958, but has subsequently been lost once again, either under the snow, or under the waters of the Southern Ocean.

The site of Little America III was carried to sea in 1963.

== Little America IV ==
Little America IV
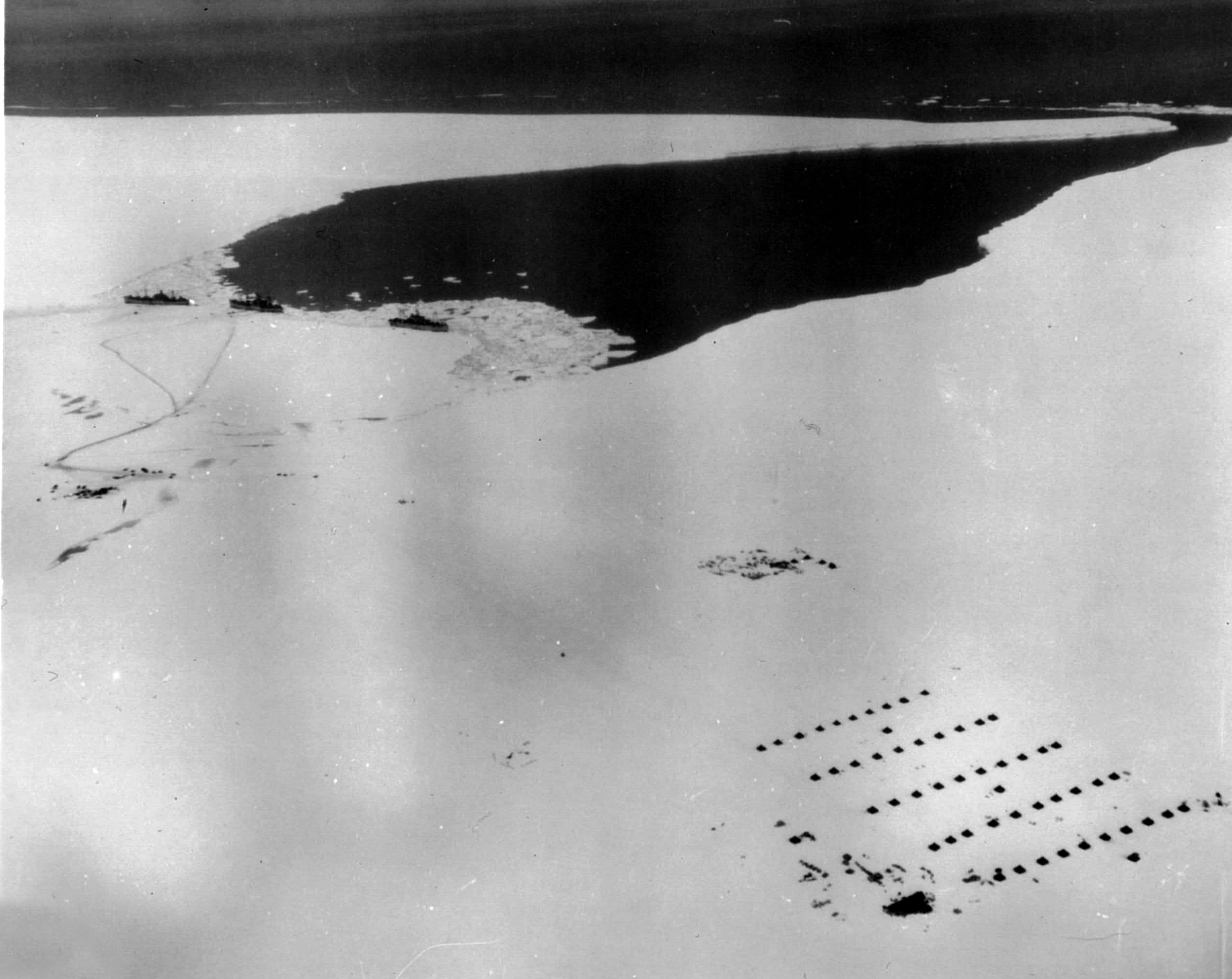
- The camp established as US Navy's Operation Highjump, 1946–1947
- Interactive map of Little America IV
- Coordinates: 78°33′00″S 163°56′00″W
- Location: Near Bay of Whales
- Established: December 1946
- Closed: 1947

Little America IV was established in 1946–1947 as the primary camp for Operation Highjump. On 2 and 5 December 1946, 166 Seabees sailed from Port Hueneme on the USS Yancey and USS Merrick assigned to Operation Highjump.

== Little America V ==
Little America V
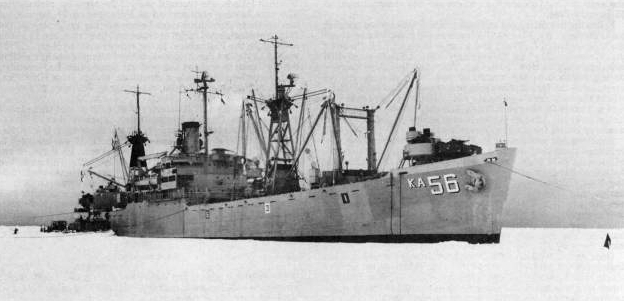
- Interactive map of Little America V
- Coordinates: 78°19′00″S 162°22′00″W
- Location: Near Kainan Bay
- Established: 3 January 1956
- Closed: 31 December 1958

Little America V was established on January 3, 1956, at Kainan Bay, some 30 miles (50 kilometers) east of Little America IV, as part of Operation Deep Freeze. Little America V served as the American base in the South Polar program in the International Geophysical Year, from July 1, 1957, to December 31, 1958. Little America V was constructed by United States Navy Seabees in the three-month window before the Antarctic winter makes construction nearly impossible. All of Little America V was constructed below the snow line in the ice, with individual living quarters, generator room, cafeteria, and with ramps leading out at one end for tracked vehicles. This type of construction meant that none of those staying in Little America V had to go outdoors in the harsh winter when going from one section to another of the Antarctic town.

The site of Little America V went to sea on Iceberg B-9 in 1987.

Little America V was one of seven bases that the United States built for the IGY, which also included McMurdo, Hallett, Wilkes, Admundsen-Scott (South Pole Station), Ellsworth, and Byrd.

== See also ==
- List of Antarctic field camps
- Brockton Station
- Byrd Station
- Dean Cullom Smith
- Ellsworth Station
- Framheim
- Hallett Station
- List of Antarctic expeditions
- McMurdo Station
- Operation Deep Freeze
- Palmer Station
- Plateau Station
- Research stations in Antarctica
- Siple Station
- South Pole Station
