= Putzke Peak =

Mountain peak in Marie Byrd Land, Antarctica

Putzke Peak (75°49′S 128°32′W) is a peak (2,325 m) at the end of the spur which descends northeast from Mount Petras, in the McCuddin Mountains, Marie Byrd Land. Mapped by United States Geological Survey (USGS) from surveys and U.S. Navy air photos, 1959–65. Named by Advisory Committee on Antarctic Names (US-ACAN) for Captain Stanley G. Putzke, USCG, commanding officer of USCGC Staten Island during Operation Deep Freeze 1970 and 1971.
