= Reynolds Ridge =

Ridge in Antarctica

Reynolds Ridge (75°40′S 129°19′W) is a rock ridge 1.5 nautical miles (2.8 km) long located 5 nautical miles (9 km) northwest of Mount Flint in the McCuddin Mountains, Marie Byrd Land. Mapped by United States Geological Survey (USGS) from surveys and U.S. Navy air photos, 1959–65. Named by Advisory Committee on Antarctic Names (US-ACAN) for Warren Reynolds, United States Department of State, who assisted in work on the Antarctic Treaty of 1959.
