= Seabee Hook =

Spit of Antarctica

Coordinates: 72°19′S 170°13′E

Location in Antarctica

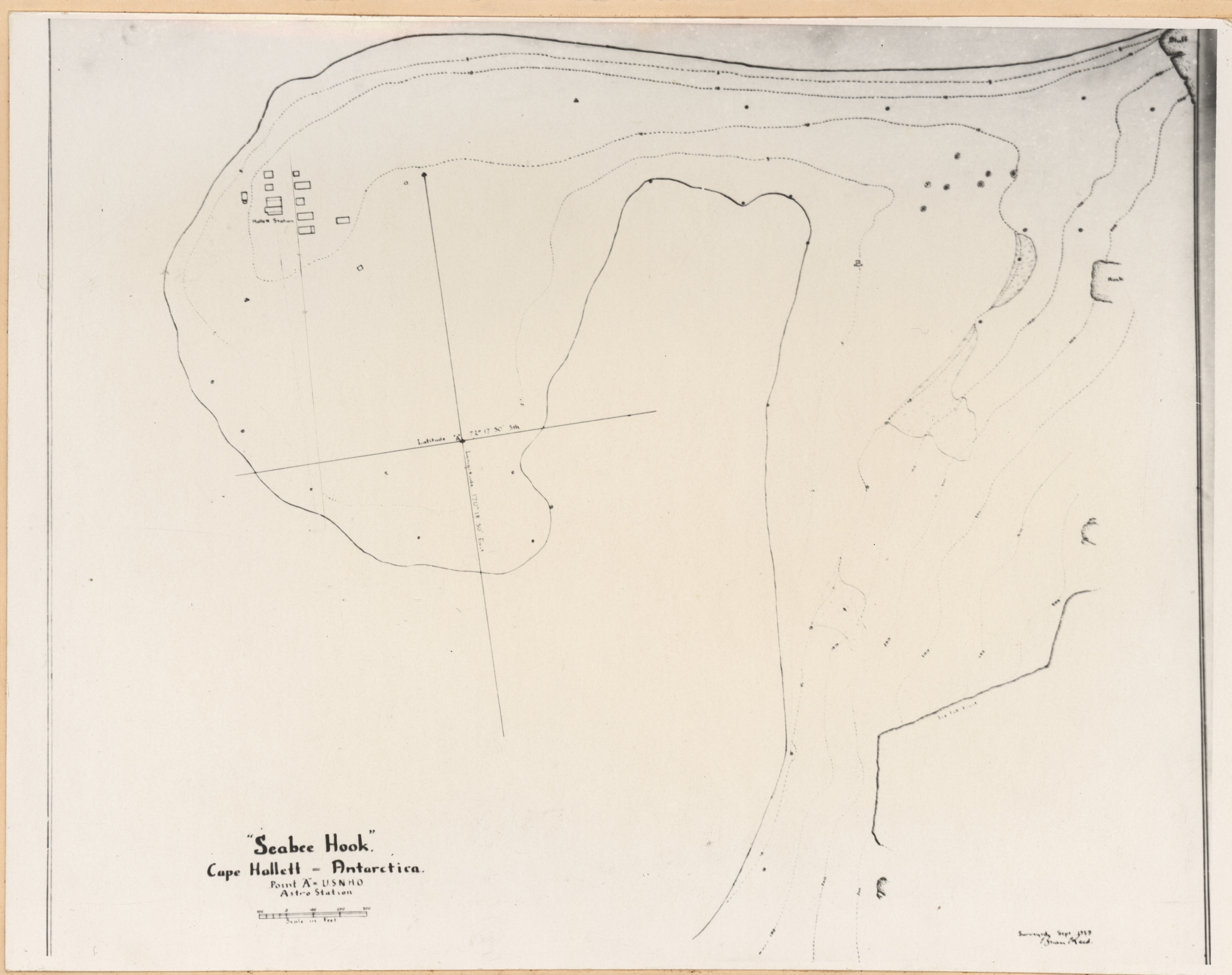
Sketch map of the spit in 1959

Seabee Hook is a low, recurved spit composed of coarse volcanic ash which projects about 900 m (984 yd) west from the high rocky ridge forming Cape Hallett, along the coast of Victoria Land. In January 1956, members of the US Navy's Operation Deep Freeze aboard the icebreaker USS Edisto investigated and surveyed this area for possible use as a base site for International Geophysical Year operations. Seabee is a phonetic spelling of CB (for "construction battalion") and refers to individual or collective members of naval construction engineer units.

== Adélie penguin colony ==
The spit is home to a large breeding colony of Adélie penguins which is protected under the Antarctic Treaty System as part of the Cape Hallett Antarctic Specially Protected Area (ASPA No.106). It has also been designated an Important Bird Area (IBA) by BirdLife International because of the size of the Adélie penguin colony, with about 64,000 breeding pairs present, as estimated in 2009. South polar skuas also breed in the IBA.

== See also ==
- Seabee
