= Antarctic Meteorological Research Center =

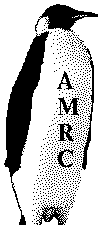
AMRC logo

The Antarctic Meteorological Research Center (AMRC) is an Antarctic research program funded by the National Science Foundation (NSF) that is based out of the Space Science and Engineering Center (SSEC) at the University of Wisconsin. The AMRC was founded as a link between the UW-Madison automatic weather station (AWS) project and the Man computer Interactive Data Access System (McIDAS) project, also at UW-Madison.

The need for satellite imagery from geostationary and polar-orbiting satellites over the Antarctic led to the formation of the AMRC. Today, the AMRC continues to create Antarctic satellite composites and conduct research with those composites and other observational data sets, such as those from UW-Madison’s AWS program. In addition, the AMRC also collects, distributes, and archives Antarctic data, and promotes Antarctic science through educational outreach activities. The AMRC is one of the primary archives of meteorological data from Antarctica and its surrounding geographic areas.

The Antarctic Meteorological Forecast Center (AMFC) at UW-Madison was devised during the same time as the founding of the AMRC as a provider of weather forecasts for research vessels operating in the vicinity of Antarctica. After several years of operation at UW-Madison, the National Science Foundation ended this program and transferred the AMFC’s responsibilities to the United States Naval Warfare System Center (SPAWAR) Office of Polar Programs.

== Research ==
Antarctic composite image showing atmospheric motion vectors from the lower (yellow), middle (cyan), and upper (magenta) troposphere

The AMRC updated its composite satellite imagery in 2014 which are derived from tests of atmospheric motion vectors. Currently, geostationary and polar-orbiting satellite observations can be used to generate wind vectors based on cloud motions or water vapor target movements over a series of three satellite images. However, the paths of the geostationary and polar-orbiting satellites leave a band of high latitudes not covered near the Antarctic and Southern Ocean. The AMRC generated atmospheric motion vectors to fill in these ‘rings’ of missing derived wind vectors.

In addition, parallel studies are being performed to test the ability to track whole cloud/storm systems with the composite images generated at the AMRC.

Improvements to the AMRC’s satellite composites are always in progress. Creating composites in additional spectral channels, such as water vapor and ‘experimental visible’, have been achieved since the development of the initial infrared satellite composite in 1992 at UW-Madison. A ‘pseudo-color’ composite was made, placing clouds and perhaps some sea ice seen in the infrared composite over the NASA Blue Marble background. The resolution of all the AMRC’s composites has been improved from the 10 km to 5 km in 2002, and as of 2013, 4 km nominal resolution. The temporal resolution of the Antarctic composites has been increased to hourly availability, a major improvement over the previous three-hourly availability.

In 2007, the AMRC, in addition to its Antarctic composites, started to create complete Arctic satellite composite images under the Arctic Satellite Composite Project. Beginning in 2012, AMRC worked with NOAA OSPO (National Oceanic and Atmospheric Administration Office of Satellite and Product Operations) to develop real-time satellite composite imagery in infrared, shortwave, longwave, water vapor, and visible channels with 4 km spatial resolution. This process became operationally managed by NOAA OSPO in 2016.

Both the AMRC and the AWS programs have participated in iceberg studies regarding the monitoring of iceberg motions and the collection of meteorological observations taken from the surface of the icebergs themselves. During the calving of icebergs in 2000, the UW-Madison AWS program installed AWS units on large calved icebergs, while the AMRC tracked the icebergs from space. The research resulted in an improved understanding of the motion of large tabular icebergs that were created by calving mechanisms.

== Outreach ==
Educational outreach supported by the National Science Foundation is an important goal of both UW-Madison’s AMRC and AWS programs. Responding to the public’s email inquiries as well as presentations to school children through outreach programs increases the awareness of the role that Antarctica plays on the planet.

== See also ==
- Antarctic Automatic Weather Stations Project
- United States Antarctic Program
- Climate of Antarctica
