= William S. Schwob =

- Born: March 15, 1927; Buffalo, New York, U.S.
- Died: September 20, 2017 (aged 90) Clearwater, Florida, U.S.
- Allegiance: United States of America
- Branch: United States Coast Guard
- Service years: 1949–1980
- Rank: Rear admiral

William Sheldon Schwob (March 15, 1927 – September 20, 2017) was a United States Coast Guard rear admiral. He served as Commander of the First Coast Guard District in Boston, Massachusetts. Schwob was born in Buffalo, New York. He retired in 1980.
