= Plateau Station =

Inactive Antarctic research station

- Antarctic research station
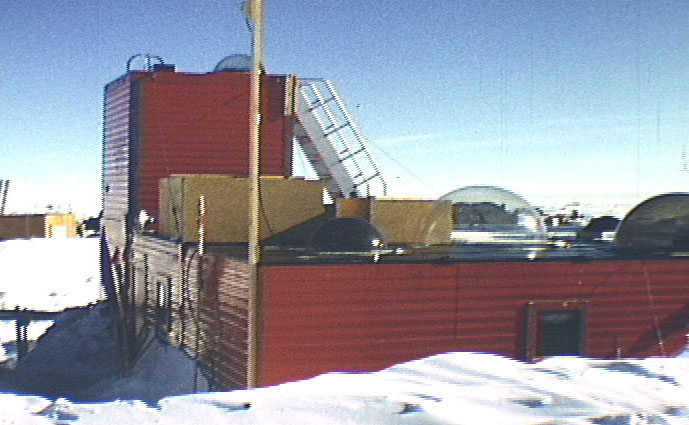
- The station in 1968

- Location in Antarctica
- Coordinates: 79°15′00″S 40°30′00″E
- Region: Queen Maud Land
- Established: 13 December 1965
- Closed: 29 January 1969
- Named after: Antarctic Plateau

Government
  - Type: Administration
  - Body: USN, NSF; United States
- Elevation: 3,624 m (11,890 ft)
- Active times: All year-round

Plateau Station Skiway
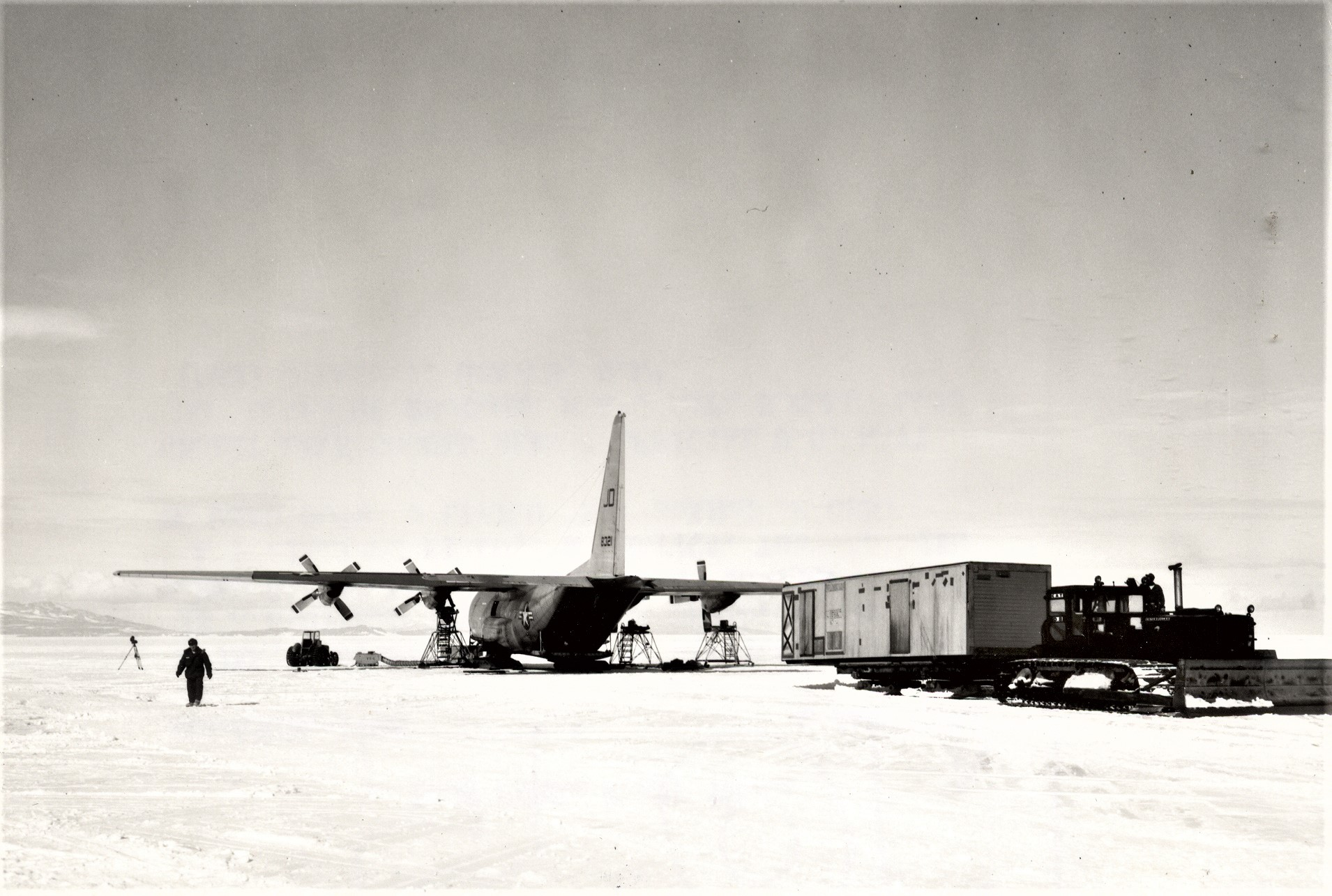
- C-130 Hercules at Plateau Station
- IATA: none; ICAO: AT20

Summary
- Operator: US Navy and National Science Foundation
- Serves: Plateau Station
- Location: Queen Maud Land; Antarctica
- Elevation AMSL: 12,027 ft (3,666 m)

Map
- Location of airfield in Antarctica

Runways
| Direction | Length | | Surface |
| Direction | ft | m | Surface |
|---|---|---|---|
| 18/36 | 11,458 | 3,492 | Snow |

Plateau Station is an inactive American research and South Pole–Queen Maud Land Traverse support base on the central Antarctic Plateau. Construction on the site started on December 13, 1965, and the first traverse team (named SPQML II) arrived in early 1966. The base was in continuous use until January 29, 1969, when it was closed but mothballed for future use, and was the most remote and coldest of any United States stations on the continent. It was also the site for the world's coldest measured average temperature for a month at that time, recorded in July 1968, at −99.8 °F (−73.2 °C).

== History ==
The station was operated and staffed by the National Science Foundation and United States Navy. A select team of four scientists and four navy personnel were on constant duty at the station, which was under the command of a naval medical doctor. Originally designed for two years of service, it was in use for three years.

Until the Fuji Dome Station opened in 1995, it was the outpost at the highest altitude at 3,624 metres (11,890 ft) above sea level. The effective altitude, due to polar circulation vortex was in excess of 4,000 metres (13,123 ft), making the base a useful location for high-altitude research. Although the cold never reached the record set at Vostok Station, the average temperature was consistently lower.

The buildings on the base were assembled from five pre-fabricated units flown in by Hercules C-130 aircraft with ski landing gear. Four units formed the main building, which is 8x25 meters; and a smaller Jamesway huts unit was constructed 300 meters away. Two 75 kW diesel generators provided the necessary energy for the main unit; and an additional generator was maintained at the standby unit. In addition, a 3,500 metres (11,483 ft) skiway was built for air transport. A 32 metres (105 ft) meteorological tower was erected with instruments at varying heights to monitor the persistent thermal air inversion layer above the Antarctic snow.

One primary purpose of the base was solar observations, given the high altitude, clear air, and relative shorter distance to the Sun during the austral summer. But it was found that the base also provided unique opportunities to observe unusual weather phenomena.

The major activities were:

- Micro Meteorology Study: This consisted of a tower equipped with instruments to take multiple samples of wind speed, wind direction and temperature. Periodic readings were taken at multiple levels on the tower to attempt to understand the "topography of weather" and how they fit into the larger framework of weather on the polar and global environment. The flatness of the Antarctic Plateau made Plateau Station a unique "test tube" for this study.
- Polar Illumination/Absorption Study: This was accomplished by the placement of multi color lenses with sensors that would measure the intensity of light striking the polar surface. Illumination from both direct and diffuse sources were periodically measured. Plateau Station was ideal for measuring this due to the relative clear atmospheric conditions.
- Upper Atomospheric Study: This was made up of instrumentation that would transmit a spectrum of Radio Frequency energy up into the atmosphere . The instrumentation would then simultaneously measure the amount of energy being reflected back to it from the upper atmosphere.
- Geomagnetic Study This consisted of large coils of wire that acted as sensors to measure the intensity of polar magnetic fields.

Ice core samples were also made, but with mixed success. On October 29, 1966, the camp inhabitants experienced a severe snowquake that lowered the altitude by 1 centimetre (0.39 in). This was apparently caused by hoar frost crystals below the surface.

The teams were also monitored for medical and psychological effects, though it turned out that selection of staff precluded any notable emotional effects. White cell counts were found to decrease as a result of few immunological stimuli in the sterile environment.

On 22 December 2007, the Norwegian-U.S. Scientific Traverse of East Antarctica visited the base and entered the buildings, finding that it was mostly intact.

In 2017, the CoFi-Expedition made a stop at the Plateau Station. They entered the station through a hatch at the top of highest building, the watch tower. The base is completely snowbound nowadays. The only visible building at the base is the meteorological tower. The expedition left the base with the same general impression as the expedition in 2007 did. Researcher Sepp Kipfstuhl said: "If someone should visit the base in 10 or even 20 years, it'll have barely changed. The meteorological tower should be visible for the next 500 years."

The last well-known visit to the station took place at the end of 2018 by the expedition of the "First Channel" of Russian television. The condition of the station was assessed by the expedition participants as "people have just left it" (the corresponding video is present on YT).

== Climate ==
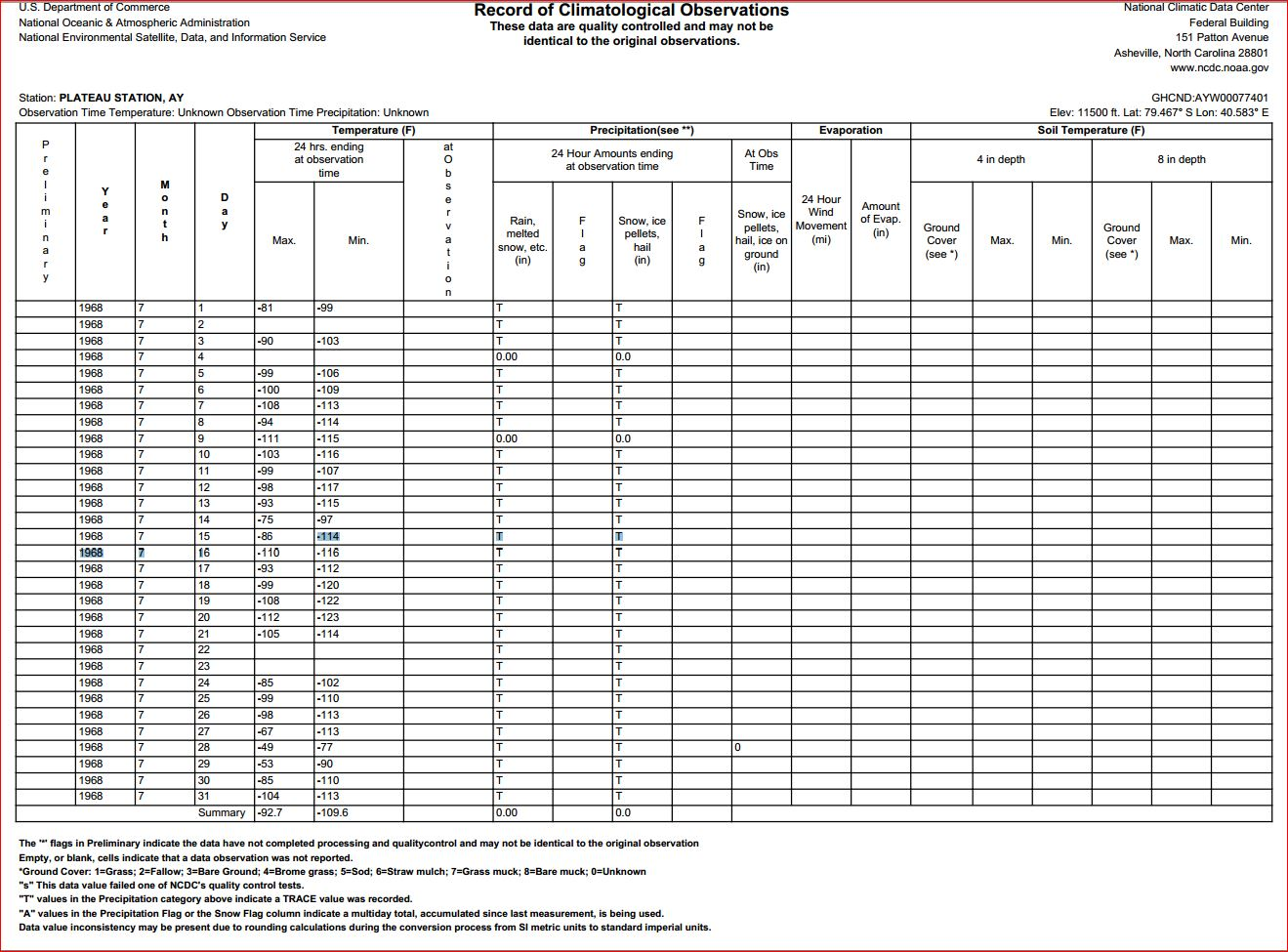
Temperature data for Plateau Station for July 1968

Plateau Station is one of the coldest places on earth and has an ice cap climate. The lowest temperature recorded in Plateau Station was -86.2 °C (-123.1 °F) on July 20, 1968. The annual average temperature is -56.7 °C (-70.1 °F). Plateau Station has cold and brief summers. and long, dark and frigid winters. Also on June 5, 1968, Plateau station had -86.1 °C (-123.0 °F). The maximum temperature on July 20, 1968 was −80 °C (−112 °F). The average temperature of the cold season (from April to October) is about −70 °C (−94 °F), while the average temperature of the warm season (from November to March) is about −40 °C (−40 °F). Although the cold didn't reach the record set at the Vostok Station, the period of record was also very short. During the period of measurement, the average temperatures were consistently lower than Vostok.

Plateau Station

Climate chart (precipitation, max. and min. temperature)
| J | F | M | A | M | J | J | A | S | O | N | D |
| 0 −25 −40 | 0 −39 −49 | 0 −53 −61 | 0 −58 −75 | 0 −59 −75 | 0 −61 −77 | 0 −60 −76 | 0 −64 −78 | 0 −57 −73 | 0 −52 −68 | 0 −41 −49 | 0 −28 −37 |
- █ Average max. and min. temperatures in °C
- █ Precipitation totals in mm
Imperial conversion
| J | F | M | A | M | J | J | A | S | O | N | D |
| 0 −13 −40 | 0 −38 −56 | 0 −64 −78 | 0 −73 −102 | 0 −73 −103 | 0 −78 −107 | 0 −76 −105 | 0 −83 −109 | 0 −71 −100 | 0 −62 −91 | 0 −41 −55 | 0 −19 −34 |
- █ Average max. and min. temperatures in °F
- █ Precipitation totals in inches

Climate data for Plateau Station
| Month | Jan | Feb | Mar | Apr | May | Jun | Jul | Aug | Sep | Oct | Nov | Dec | Year |
|---|---|---|---|---|---|---|---|---|---|---|---|---|---|
| Record high °C (°F) | −18.3 (−0.9) | −25.0 (−13.0) | −36.1 (−33.0) | −42.7 (−44.9) | −38.9 (−38.0) | −32.7 (−26.9) | −43.9 (−47.0) | −42.7 (−44.9) | −37.7 (−35.9) | −37.2 (−35.0) | −26.6 (−15.9) | −20.6 (−5.1) | −18.3 (−0.9) |
| Mean daily maximum °C (°F) | −24.9 (−12.8) | −39.0 (−38.2) | −53.3 (−63.9) | −58.1 (−72.6) | −58.5 (−73.3) | −61.0 (−77.8) | −60.0 (−76.0) | −64.1 (−83.4) | −57.0 (−70.6) | −52.2 (−62.0) | −40.8 (−41.4) | −28.1 (−18.6) | −49.7 (−57.5) |
| Daily mean °C (°F) | −34.3 (−29.7) | −44.3 (−47.7) | −57.3 (−71.1) | −66.8 (−88.2) | −66.9 (−88.4) | −69.3 (−92.7) | −68.2 (−90.8) | −71.3 (−96.3) | −65.2 (−85.4) | −60.2 (−76.4) | −44.7 (−48.5) | −32.2 (−26.0) | −56.7 (−70.1) |
| Mean daily minimum °C (°F) | −40.0 (−40.0) | −49.1 (−56.4) | −61.3 (−78.3) | −74.6 (−102.3) | −74.8 (−102.6) | −77.0 (−106.6) | −76.0 (−104.8) | −78.1 (−108.6) | −73.4 (−100.1) | −68.1 (−90.6) | −48.6 (−55.5) | −36.6 (−33.9) | −63.1 (−81.6) |
| Record low °C (°F) | −48.9 (−56.0) | −60.5 (−76.9) | −75.5 (−103.9) | −77.7 (−107.9) | −80.5 (−112.9) | −86.1 (−123.0) | −86.2 (−123.2) | −85.0 (−121.0) | −84.4 (−119.9) | −80.0 (−112.0) | −66.1 (−87.0) | −47.7 (−53.9) | −86.2 (−123.2) |

== See also ==
- List of Antarctic research stations
- List of Antarctic field camps
- List of airports in Antarctica
- McMurdo Station
- South Pole Station
- Byrd Station
- Palmer Station
- Siple Station
- Ellsworth Station
- Brockton Station
- Eights Station
- Operation Deep Freeze
- Hallett Station
- Little America V

== Gallery ==
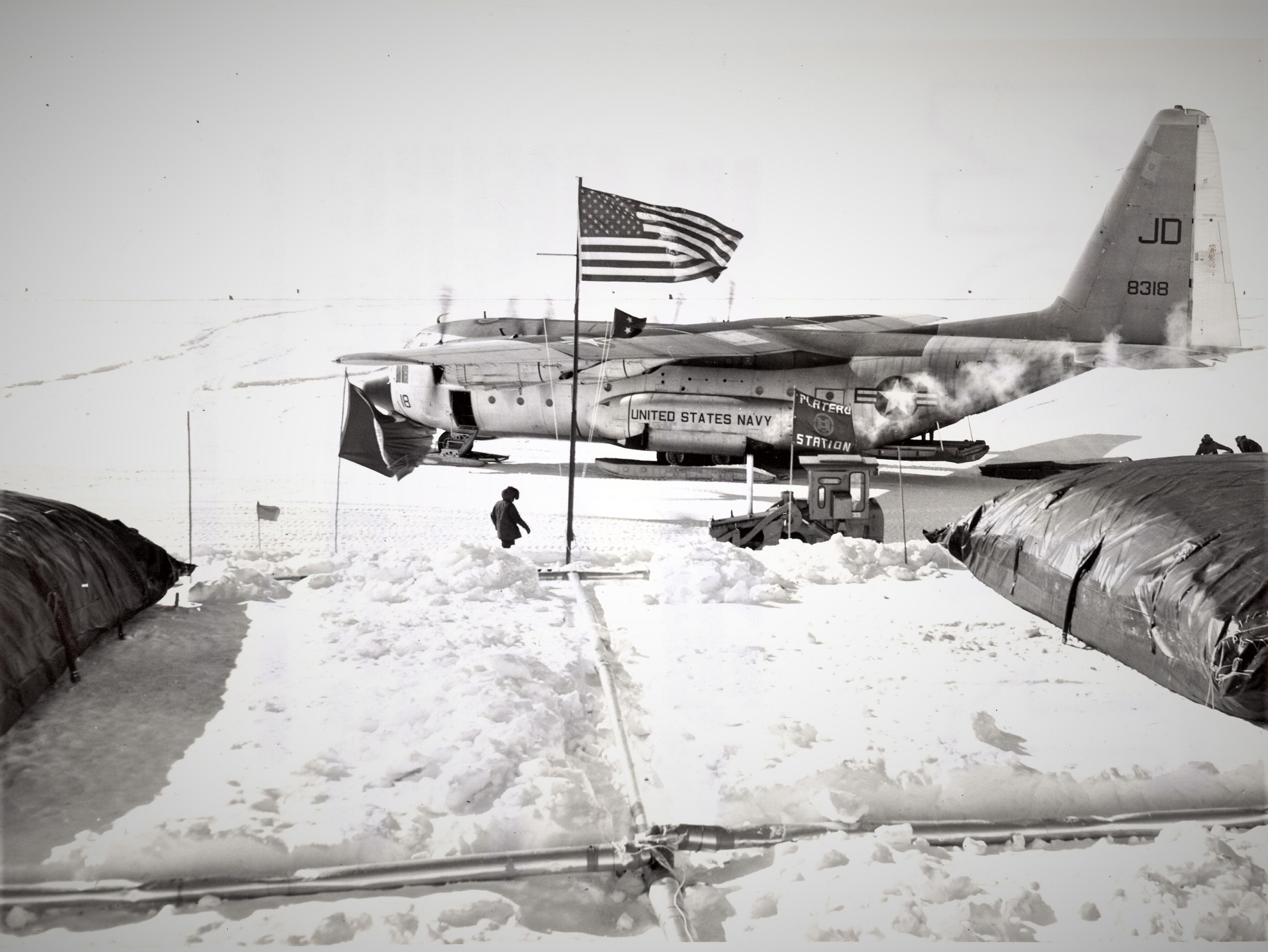
C-130 Hercules at Plateau airstrip

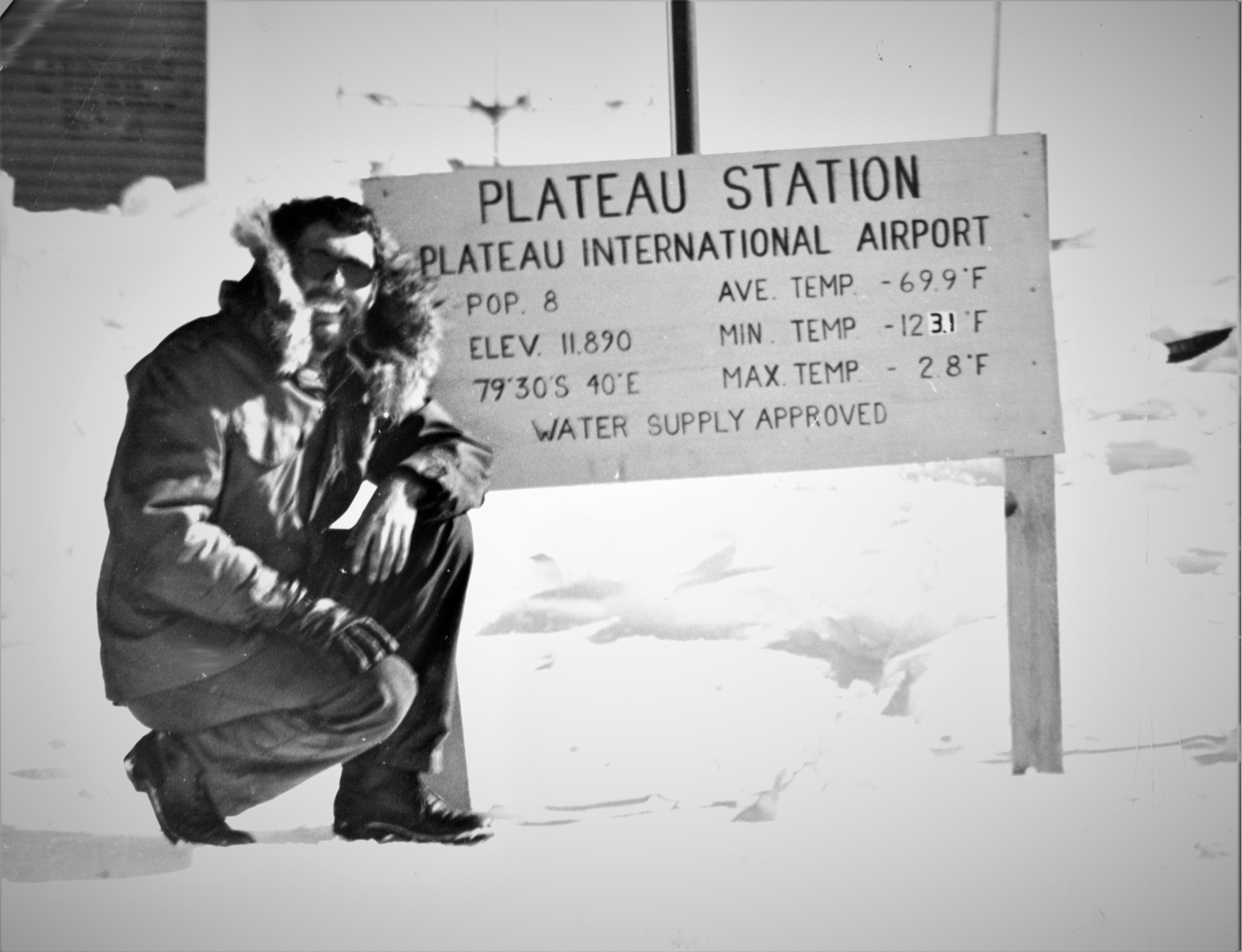
"Plateau Station International Airport" in 1968

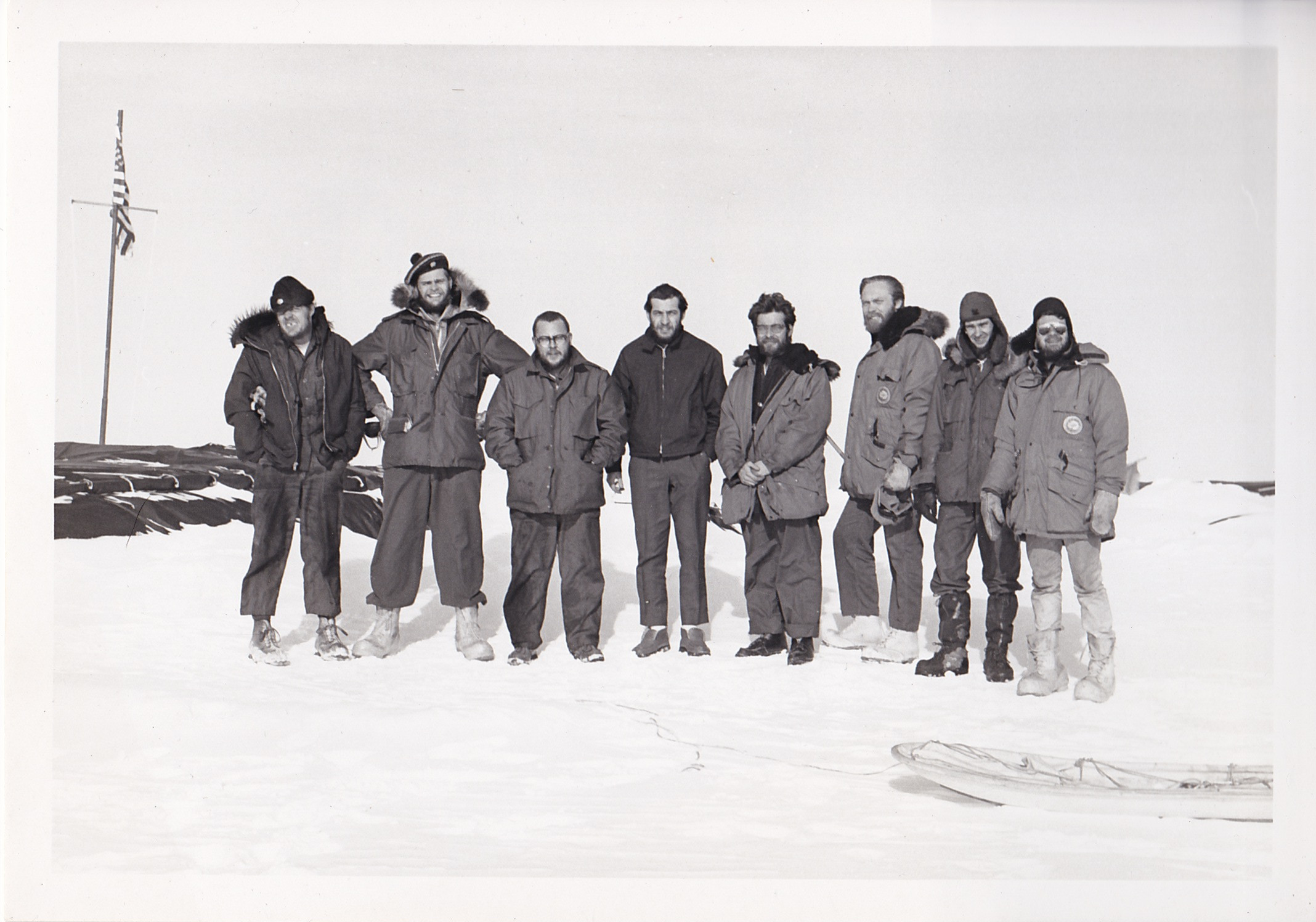
Plateau Light Brigade from 1968

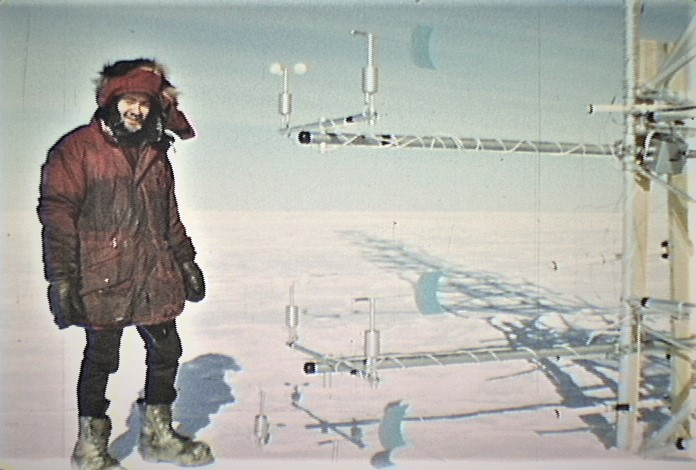
Plateau Station Micro Meteorology Tower 1969
