= McCuddin Mountains =

Mountain range in Antarctica

- Location within Antarctica

Highest point
- Peak: Mount Petras
- Elevation: 2,865 m (9,400 ft)
- Coordinates: 75°52′S 128°39′W

Geography
- Region: Marie Byrd Land, West Antarctica

The McCuddin Mountains are a small cluster of mountains in Antarctica consisting mainly of two large mountains, Mount Flint and Mount Petras, along with several scattered peaks and nunataks. Located in Marie Byrd Land, 64 km (40 mi) east of the Ames Range, with Wallace Rock as its southeast extremity.

The mountains were discovered and photographed from the air in a flight from West Base of the U.S. Antarctic Service on Dec. 14, 1940. They were mapped by U.S. Geological Survey (USGS) from surveys and U.S. Navy air photos, 1959-65. Named by Advisory Committee on Antarctic Names (US-ACAN) for Rear Admiral Leo B. McCuddin, U.S. Navy (USN), Commander of the U.S. Naval Support Force, Antarctica, 1972.

== Mount Flint ==
Mount Flint (75°44′S 129°06′W) is a prominent rounded and mainly snow-covered mountain, 2,695 metres (8,842 ft), standing 16 km (10 mi) NW of Mount Petras. The feature was observed from aircraft of the U.S. Antarctic Service (USAS) in Flight G, Dec. 15, 1940, and was briefly referred to as "Mount Gray". Asher Peak is a peak in the south west portion of the mountain.

It was mapped in detail by U.S. Geological Survey (USGS), 1959-65. Named by US-ACAN for Robert B. Flint, Jr., U.S. Antarctic Research Program (USARP) scientist on high latitude geophysical and geomagnetic phenomena. Flint wintered over at Byrd Station, 1964, Plateau Station where he was scientific leader, 1966, and Vostok Station where he was U.S. Exchange Scientist, 1974.

== Gillick Rock ==
Gillick Rock (75°36′S 129°12′W) is an isolated rock nunatak lying at the northwest end of the McCuddin Mountains, 8 nautical miles (15 km) north of the summit of Mount Flint. Mapped by United States Geological Survey (USGS) from ground surveys and U.S. Navy tricamera aerial photographs, 1959-66. Named by US-ACAN for Lieutenant Thomas L. Gillick, U.S. Navy Reserve, helicopter pilot who flew close support for United States Antarctic Research Program (USARP) scientists during Operation Deep Freeze 1970 and 1971.

== Mount Petras ==
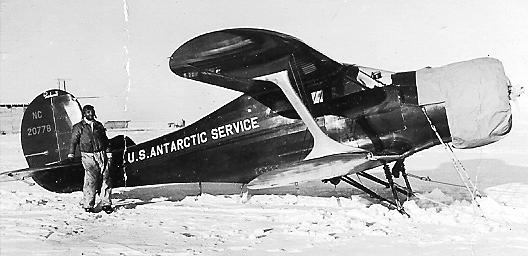
NC20778 Staggerwing 5PCLB

Mount Petras (75°52′S 128°39′W) is a high, prominent, ridge-shaped mountain, 2,865 metres (9,400 ft), standing 16 km (10 mi) southeast of Mount Flint. It was discovered by the US Antarctic Service (USAS) on a flight from West Base on December 15, 1940, and named for Theodore A. Petras, master technical sergeant, USMC, pilot of the airplane, a Beechcraft 5PCLB, Model D-17-A, SN357 REG NC20778 on this flight with Dr. Siple.

== Navarette Peak ==
Navarrette Peak (75°55′S 128°45′W) is a rock peak marking the southwest extremity of the Mount Petras massif, in the McCuddin Mountains of Marie Byrd Land. Mapped by United States Geological Survey (USGS) from surveys and U.S. Navy air photos, 1959–69. Named by Advisory Committee on Antarctic Names (US-ACAN) for Captain Claude Navarrette, U.S. Navy, deputy commander and chief of staff to the commander, U.S. Naval Support Force, Antarctica, during Operation Deep Freeze 1972. He also served on the staff during 1969 and 1970.

== Schwob Peak ==
Schwob Peak (75°53′S 128°39′W) is a peak standing 2,715 metres (8,907 ft) located 2.4 km (1.5 mi) south of Mount Petras. Mapped by United States Geological Survey (USGS) from surveys and U.S. Navy air photos, 1959-65. Named by US-ACAN for Captain William S. Schwob, USCG, commanding officer of USCGC Southwind during Operation Deep Freeze 1972.

== See also ==
- List of mountains of East Antarctica
- Reynolds Ridge
