= Byrd Station =

- Antarctic research station
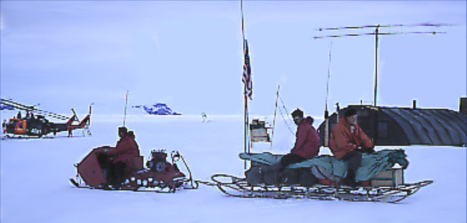
- Sleds pulled by snowmobiles or dogs provided transportation between camps around 1960

- Location in Antarctica
- Coordinates: 80°00′53″S 119°33′56″W
- Region: Marie Byrd Land
- Established: 1 January 1957
- Abandoned: 2005
- Named for: Richard E. Byrd

Government
  - Type: Administration
  - Body: United States Navy
- Elevation: 1,553 m (5,095 ft)
- Active times: All year-round until 1972, every summer until 2005

The Byrd Station is a former research station established by the United States during the International Geophysical Year (1957) by U.S. Navy Seabees during Operation Deep Freeze II in West Antarctica. It was a year-round base until 1972, and then seasonal up to 2005. The station is located on the West Antarctic ice cap. It was accessible by overland ice traverse or by ski-equipped C-130 aircraft.

== History ==
A joint Army, Navy, Air Force, and Marines operation supported an overland tractor train traverse that left out of Little America V in late 1956 to establish the station. The train was led by Army Major Merle Dawson and completed a traverse of 646 miles (1,040 km) over unexplored country in Marie Byrd Land to blaze a trail to a spot selected beforehand. The station consisted of a set of four prefabricated buildings and was erected in less than one month by U.S. Navy Seabees. It was commissioned on January 1, 1957. The original station ("Old Byrd") lasted about four years before it began to collapse under the snow.

Byrd was one of seven bases that the United States built for the International Geophysical Year, which also included McMurdo, Hallett, Wilkes, Admundsen-Scott (South Pole Station), Ellsworth, and Little America.

Construction of a second underground station in a nearby location began in 1960, and it was used until 1972. The Operation Deep Freeze activities were succeeded by "Operation Deep Freeze II", and so on, continuing a constant U.S. presence in Antarctica since that date. The Coast Guard participated: USCGC Northwind supported the mission 1971–72, 1972–73, 1976–77, 1979–80. The Navy's Antarctic Development Squadron Six had been flying scientific and military missions to Greenland and the arctic compound's Williams Field since 1975. In early 1996, the United States National Guard announced that the 109th Airlift Wing at Schenectady County Airport in Scotia, New York was slated to assume that entire mission from the United States Navy in 1999. The 109th operated ski-equipped LC-130s had been flying National Science Foundation support missions to Antarctica since 1988. The Antarctic operation would be fully funded by the National Science Foundation. The 109th expected to add approximately 235 full-time personnel to support that operation. The station was then converted into a summer-only field camp until it was abandoned in 2004–05.

John P. Turtle, an aurora researcher at Byrd Station in 1962, gave his name to Turtle Peak.

The National Science Foundation, which manages the U.S. Antarctic Program (USAP), had plans as of June 2009 to build a new camp to support a number of scientific projects in West Antarctica, including work at Pine Island Glacier. The camp, located about 1,400 kilometers from the USAP's main facility, McMurdo Station, will support up to 50 people and will be used mainly as a refuelling station to support flights in the region. A second field camp near Pine Island Glacier, for a project led by NASA scientist Robert Bindschadler, was also planned. That facility will support helicopter operations to the ice shelf.

== Climate ==
Byrd Station has an ice cap climate (EF), with all months consistently having a below-freezing average temperature.

During its operation the station has recorded a warming trend, with warming fastest in its winter and spring. The spot, which is in the heart of the West Antarctic Ice Sheet, is one of the fastest-warming places on Earth.

Climate data for Byrd Station, elevation: 1,543 m or 5,062 ft, 1961-1990 normals and extremes
Month	Jan	Feb	Mar	Apr	May	Jun	Jul	Aug	Sep	Oct	Nov	Dec	Year
Record high °C (°F)	5.0 (41.0)	−3.3 (26.1)	−8.9 (16.0)	−8.3 (17.1)	−8.3 (17.1)	−10.6 (12.9)	−12.2 (10.0)	−13.9 (7.0)	−10.0 (14.0)	−12.8 (9.0)	−6.1 (21.0)	1.1 (34.0)	5.0 (41.0)
Daily mean °C (°F)	−14.6 (5.7)	−20.1 (−4.2)	−27.5 (−17.5)	−30.0 (−22.0)	−33.1 (−27.6)	−34.4 (−29.9)	−35.4 (−31.7)	−36.3 (−33.3)	−37.3 (−35.1)	−31.5 (−24.7)	−21.9 (−7.4)	−15.4 (4.3)	−28.1 (−18.6)
Record low °C (°F)	−28.9 (−20.0)	−40.0 (−40.0)	−51.1 (−60.0)	−56.7 (−70.1)	−61.7 (−79.1)	−61.1 (−78.0)	−60.6 (−77.1)	−62.2 (−80.0)	−62.2 (−80.0)	−58.3 (−72.9)	−43.3 (−45.9)	−34.4 (−29.9)	−62.2 (−80.0)
Average precipitation mm (inches)	6 (0.2)	4 (0.2)	2 (0.1)	1 (0.0)	5 (0.2)	3 (0.1)	2 (0.1)	1 (0.0)	trace	1 (0.0)	2 (0.1)	3 (0.1)	30 (1.2)
Average snowfall cm (inches)	5.1 (2.0)	3.0 (1.2)	2.3 (0.9)	0.5 (0.2)	1.8 (0.7)	1.0 (0.4)	0.8 (0.3)	0.3 (0.1)	trace	0.3 (0.1)	trace	1.3 (0.5)	16.4 (6.4)
Average precipitation days (≥ 1.0 mm)	2.4	1.3	0.5	0.3	1.2	1.3	0.5	0.3	0.0	0.0	0.6	1.1	9.5
Source: NOAA

== See also ==
- Marie Byrd Land in popular culture
- List of Antarctic research stations
- List of Antarctic field camps
- McMurdo Station
- South Pole Station
- Operation Deep Freeze
- Palmer Station
- Siple Station
- Ellsworth Station
- Brockton Station
- Eights Station
- Plateau Station
- Hallett Station
- Little America V
