= Frakes =

Frakes may refer to:

- Frakes, Kentucky, unincorporated community in Bell County
- Mount Frakes, prominent mountain marking the highest elevation in the Crary Mountains in Marie Byrd Land
- Frakes Aviation, American aircraft manufacturer

== People with the surname ==
- Frakes family:
  - Frank Frakes (1860–1933), American pioneer rancher, grandfather of George and cousin of William and Laurence
    - George E. Frakes (born 1932), American historian, father of Robert, grandson of Frank
      - Robert Frakes (born 1962), American historian, son of George
  - Lawrence A. Frakes (born 1930), American and Australian geologist and paleoclimatologist, cousin of Frank and William
  - William Franklin Frakes (1858–1942), American rancher, naturalist, adventurer, and author, cousin of Frank and Laurence
- Bill Frakes, American photographer
- Jerold Frakes, American literature historian
- Jonathan Frakes (born 1952), American actor and director
- Laura J. Frakes, American educator
- Randall Frakes, American film and science fiction writer
