= Henry G. Ferguson =

American geologist (1882-1966)

- Henry G. Ferguson, circa 1950
- Born: Henry Gardiner Ferguson; January 21, 1882; San Rafael, California
- Died: November 29, 1966 (aged 84); Washington, D.C.
- Education: Harvard University; Yale University
- Known for: Geology of the western Great Basin; Amargosa Chaos; mapping of the Sonoma Range in Nevada; discovery of the Carlin gold deposits; co-founder of the Moyaone Reserve community in Accokeek, Maryland
- Spouse: Alice Lowe (m. 1914; died 1951)
- Awards: Department of the Interior's "Distinguished Service Award"
- Scientific career
- Fields: Geology

Henry Gardiner Ferguson (January 21, 1882 – November 29, 1966) was an American geologist with the United States Geological Survey (USGS). He worked primarily in Nevada and was a pioneer in the geology of the central Great Basin, producing many publications, including multiple USGS geological maps of central Nevada. Ferguson was a lifelong friend and colleague of Levi Noble, a mentor to Ralph Roberts, and worked extensively with Siemon Muller. Along with his wife Alice Ferguson, he helped found the Moyaone Reserve community in Accokeek, Maryland.

== Early life ==
Henry Ferguson was born on January 21, 1882, in San Rafael, California, the son of Emma Jane (Gardiner) and Henry Ferguson. Shortly thereafter his family moved to the East Coast and Ferguson earned a BA, a BS, and an MA (1906) from Harvard University. Post-graduation geological jobs in Michigan and the Philippines inspired him to do graduate study in geology at Yale University. Although his PhD requirements were finished by 1912, he did not receive his actual degree until an informal oral exam in 1924, with his 1924 USGS bulletin on the Manhattan mining district in Nevada being accepted as his dissertation.

== Career ==
Ferguson was employed by the USGS from 1912 until his mandatory formal retirement in 1952 at the age of 70; he worked primarily as a field geologist. His early work dealt with ore deposits and economic geology; among his early published papers (1914) were two articles describing the geology of mining areas in northern California at Weaverville in the Klamath Mountains and Alleghany in the Sierra Nevada. Subsequently, his primary fieldwork area was west-central Nevada, where his early work continued to describe the geology of mining districts, while his later work was more focused on structural geology. According to geologist Thomas Nolan in 1966, "Most of our present concepts of the geology of the western Great Basin are based on [Ferguson's] pioneering work." Ferguson continued to do fieldwork in Nevada after his retirement from the USGS, but in 1957 he suffered the loss of an eye when the steel head of a geologic pick shattered.

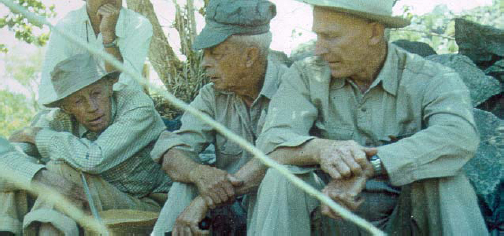
Ferguson (center) in the field with Levi Noble (left) and James Gilluly (right), 1950s

During the 1930s, Ferguson began a two-decade collaboration with the paleontologist and geologist Siemon Muller. They did extensive field mapping in west-central Nevada, culminating in the publication of their 1949 paper, "Structural Geology of the Hawthorne and Tonopah Quadrangles, Nevada." Between 1951 and 1954, Ferguson, Muller, Stanley H. Cathcart, and Ralph Roberts (in various combinations) published seven US Geological Survey 1:125,000 quadrangle maps of Nevada, including Winnemucca and Golconda.

Ferguson was also a lifelong friend and confidant of Levi Noble. According to Wright and Troxel (2002, p. 26), in the late 1930s the USGS dispatched Ferguson to assist Noble in interpreting and publishing Noble's extensive Death Valley fieldwork. In the 1950s, Noble recalled that "the major interpretations in [Noble's 1941 paper about the Amargosa Chaos] grew out of his conversations with Ferguson."

Ferguson made one of the earliest reports of Paleozoic deformation in Nevada in his 1924 bulletin on the Manhattan district. In 1939, Ralph Roberts, on one of his first assignments as a USGS employee, joined senior geologists Ferguson and Siemon Muller on a project mapping the Sonoma Range in Nevada. Roberts' work in the Battle Mountain/Antler Peak area of Nevada, done partially with Ferguson's mentorship and funding assistance, demonstrated that the Paleozoic deformation was a full scale orogeny; this was later described as the Antler orogeny in Roberts' 1949 Yale PhD dissertation.

Ferguson worked for the USGS Military Geology Unit during World War II (as did his colleagues James Gilluly, Siemon Muller, Levi Noble, and Ralph Roberts); this included a heavy-mineral sand analysis by Ferguson that contributed to the identification of the source location of the Japanese balloon bombs. Ferguson was also intermittently head of the USGS Metals division. In 1953, he received the Department of the Interior's "Distinguished Service Award".

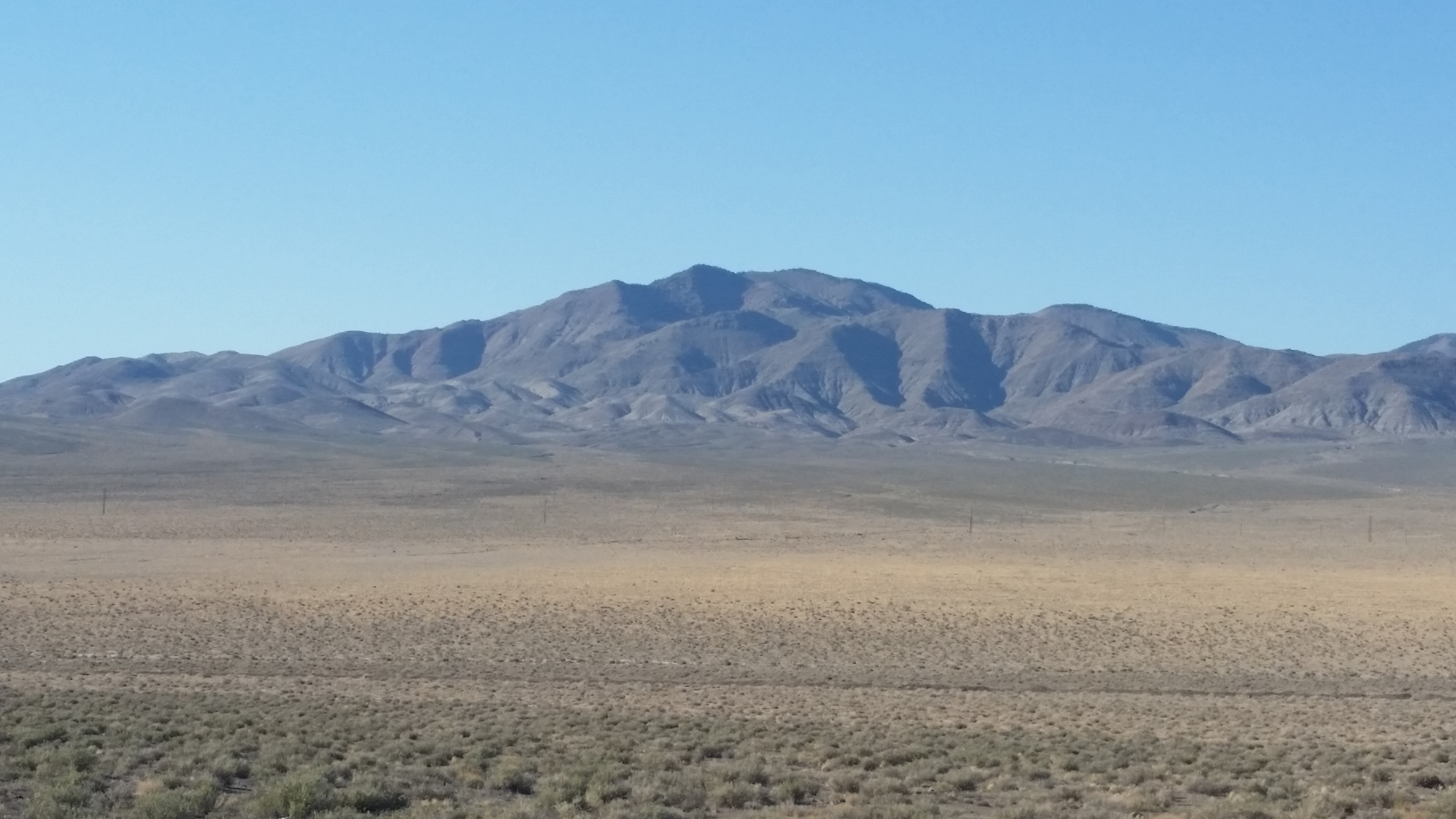
Mount Ferguson, Nevada, USA

Mount Ferguson, a mountain in the Gabbs Range in Nevada, 28 miles (45 km) east of Walker Lake, was named for Henry Ferguson.

== Personal life ==
In 1914, Henry married Alice Lowe, a Washington socialite, painter and avid amateur archeologist. Following the wedding, they went on a year-long honeymoon in South America, and then settled into a house in NW Washington, D.C. In 1922, Alice Ferguson purchased a 139-acre (56 ha) farm named Hard Bargain in Accokeek, in southern Maryland, as a weekend retreat for her husband and herself. When Native American artifacts were discovered on the property, Alice started archeological excavations, with the occasional assistance of Henry and his geologist colleagues, such as Thomas Nolan. The area became known as the Accokeek Creek Site and was eventually included in Piscataway Park. Over time, the Fergusons continued to purchase neighboring rural land, and the area grew and developed into a community known as the Moyaone Reserve.

Alice died in 1951, but Henry continued to live at Hard Bargain and was active in the community until his death in 1966. In 1954, he established the non-profit Alice Ferguson Foundation in his wife's memory; the foundation remains very active in environmental education and is based at Hard Bargain. In 1957, Ferguson was one of the founders of the Accokeek Foundation, an organization dedicated to preserving the "natural beauty along the Maryland shore of the historic Potomac River." In 1953, he donated money to open the first Accokeek public library, and in the late 1960s, the Henry G. Ferguson Elementary School in Accokeek (now closed) was named after him.

Henry was known by friends, professional colleagues, and community members as "Fergie." In the 1950s and early 1960s, Fergie would deliver eggs around the Moyaone Reserve neighborhood while driving his old wood-paneled Ford station wagon, with neighborhood children hanging onto the sides.

Henry Ferguson died in Washington, D.C., on November 29, 1966.

== Selected publications ==
(See Nolan, 1966, for a more complete list of publications, although Ferguson's early work on Iceland and the Philippines is not included).

- Ferguson, HG. 1906. Tertiary and Recent Glaciation of an Icelandic Valley, Journal of Geology, v 14, #2, pp 122–133. https://www.jstor.org/stable/pdf/30055594.pdf
- Ferguson, HG. 1914. Gold Lodes of the Weaverville Quadrangle, California, US Geological Survey Bulletin #540, pp 22–79. https://pubs.usgs.gov/bul/0540a/report.pdf
- Ferguson, HG. 1914. Lode Deposits of the Alleghany District, California, US Geological Survey Bulletin #580, pp 153–182. https://pubs.usgs.gov/bul/0580i/report.pdf
- Ferguson, HG. 1916. The Golden Arrow, Clifford, and Ellendale Districts, Nye County, Nevada, US Geological Survey Bulletin #640, pp 113–123. https://pubs.usgs.gov/bul/0640f/report.pdf
- Ferguson, HG. 1921. The Mogollon District, New Mexico. US Geological Survey Bulletin #715, pp 171–204. https://pubs.usgs.gov/bul/0715l/report.pdf
- Ferguson, HG. 1921. The Round Mountain District, Nevada, US Geological Survey Bulletin #725, pp 383–406. https://pubs.usgs.gov/bul/0725i/report.pdf
- Ferguson, HG. 1924. Geology and Ore Deposits of the Manhattan District, Nevada. US Geological Survey Bulletin #723. https://pubs.usgs.gov/bul/0723/report.pdf
- Ferguson, HG. 1929/1944. The Mining Districts of Nevada. Economic Geology, v 24, #2; reprinted in 1944 as University of Nevada Bulletin, Vol XXXVII, #4. ftp://dataworks.library.unr.edu/keck/mining/Bulletin40/b40.pdf
- Ferguson, HG, and Gannett, RW. 1932. Gold Quartz Veins of the Alleghany District, California, US Geological Survey Professional Paper 172. https://pubs.usgs.gov/pp/0172/report.pdf
- Muller, SW, and Ferguson, HG. 1936. Triassic and Jurassic Formations of West-Central Nevada, Geological Society of America Bulletin, v 47, #2, pp 241–251.
- Muller, SW, and Ferguson, HG. 1939. Mesozoic Stratigraphy of the Hawthorne and Tonopah Quadrangles, Nevada, Geological Society of American Bulletin, v 50, #10, pp 1573–1624.
- Ferguson, HG, and Muller, SW. 1949. Structural Geology of the Hawthorne and Tonopah Quadrangles, Nevada. US Geological Survey Professional Paper #216. https://pubs.usgs.gov/pp/0216/report.pdf
- Ferguson, HG, Roberts, RJ, and Muller, SW. 1951. Geology of the Winnemucca Quadrangle, Nevada. US Geological Survey Quadrangle Map GQ11. https://ngmdb.usgs.gov/Prodesc/proddesc_554.htm
- Ferguson, HG, Muller, SW, and Roberts, RJ. 1951. Geology of the Golconda Quadrangle, Nevada. US Geological Survey Quadrangle Map GQ15. https://ngmdb.usgs.gov/Prodesc/proddesc_598.htm
- Roberts, RJ, Hotz, PE, Gilluly, J, and Ferguson, HG. 1958. Paleozoic Rocks of North-Central Nevada. AAPG Bulletin, v 42, #12, pp 2813–2857.
- Ferguson, AL, and Ferguson, HG. 1960 (reprinted in 1980). The Piscataway Indians of Southern Maryland. Alice Ferguson Foundation, Accokeek, MD. (Henry Ferguson's posthumous revision of an earlier manuscript by Alice.)
- Ferguson, HG. 1966. Hard Bargain Adventures. Alice Ferguson Foundation, Accokeek, MD.
