= George E. Frakes =

American historian

George Edward Frakes (born 1932) is an American historian.

== Biography ==
Frakes is the son of Tidewater Oil Company field executive Samuel Franklin Frakes and public elementary school teacher Frances Fountaine Frakes. He grew up in the Los Angeles, CA, area and is the grandson of Elizabeth Lake (Los Angeles County, California), pioneer Frank Frakes. His cousins include naturalist William Franklin Frakes and geologist Lawrence A. Frakes. Through his maternal aunt Josephine Fountaine, he was also the nephew of Hollywood screenwriter, and founder of the United States Coast Guard Auxiliary, Malcolm Stuart Boylan. After graduating from high school, Frakes studied Geography at Stanford University where he also played on the Freshman Basketball team and the Volleyball team. He was also a cadet in Air Force ROTC.

After graduating from Stanford, he was commissioned a 2nd lieutenant in the US Air Force Reserve and went through flight training. He married his Stanford classmate Catherine Davies (sister of the late US diplomat and Ambassador Rodger Davies). Frakes continued serving in the US Air Force Reserve for over 20 years, retiring with the rank of Major. After he ended his active duty as a 1st lieutenant, he earned a master's degree in Education at Stanford University and taught at high schools in Santa Barbara, California and at Punahou School in Hawaii. He also coached several sports at the high school level.

Frakes then went on to earn his Ph.D. in History at the University of California, Santa Barbara where his dissertation was directed by Wilbur Jacobs. With Alexander DeConde, he wrote an instructor's manual for DeConde's popular "Patterns in American History" textbook. Frakes then revised his doctoral dissertation and published it as Laboratory for Liberty: The South Carolina Legislative Committee System, 1719-1776. He taught at Santa Barbara City College for over 30 years, working his way up from Instructor to Full Professor (including service as History Department Chair and Social Sciences Division Chair). His writing interests expanded beyond Colonial American history to environmental history, California history, and the history of marginalized groups in the USA. While teaching he also published Pollution Papers (Appleton-Century-Crofts, 1971) and Minorities in California History (Random, House, 1971), both co-edited with his colleague Curtis B. Solberg. He also co-authored a widely used United States History textbook From Columbus to Aquarius: An Interpretive History (Dryden, 1976) with his colleague W. Royce Adams, which was praised for its even-handed treatment of Native Americans. A popular teacher, Frakes was honored with the “Faculty Lecturer” Award at Santa Barbara City College in 1988. He retired and was awarded emeritus status in 1994.

Frakes married teacher and librarian Catherine Rose Kay Davies (1932–2016), whom he met when they were both students at Stanford. One of their children, Robert Frakes, is also a historian.

== Selected publications ==
- George E. Frakes and Alexander DeConde, Instructor’s Manual for Patterns in American History (Belmont: Wadsworth, 1969)
- George E. Frakes, Laboratory for Liberty: The South Carolina Legislative Committee System, 1719-1776 (Lexington, KY: The University of Kentucky Press, 1970)
- George E. Frakes and Curtis B. Solberg, Pollution Papers (New York: Appleton-Century-Crofts, 1971)
- George E. Frakes and Curtis B. Solberg, Minorities in California History (New York: Random House, 1971)
- George E. Frakes and W. Royce Adams, From Columbus to Aquarius: An Interpretive History (Hinsdale, IL: Dryden Press, 1976)
