= Siemon Muller =

American paleontologist

Siemon William Muller
- Born: May 9, 1900; Blagoveshchensk
- Died: September 9, 1970 (aged 70); Stanford University
- Citizenship: American
- Education: University of Oregon; Stanford University
- Known for: Triassic paleontology and stratigraphy; permafrost
- Spouse: Vera Vilamovsky (m. 1928)
- Scientific career
- Fields: Paleontology; geology
- Workplaces: Stanford University

Siemon William Muller (May 9, 1900 – September 9, 1970) was an American paleontologist and geologist, known for his studies on Triassic paleontology and stratigraphy, and for his work on permafrost.

Siemon Muller was born in Blagoveshchensk on May 9, 1900 (Muller's father Wilhelm had moved from Denmark to Russia to work on the trans-Siberian telegraph line and later became a teacher). Siemon attended the Russian Naval Academy until the Russian Revolution overtook the nation, when he moved to Shanghai to work with an American company. He sailed to the United States in 1921, and enrolled at the University of Oregon, where he studied geology. He graduated in 1927, and married Vera Vilamovsky the next year. Muller earned his master's degree from Stanford University in 1929, and his doctorate in 1930, studying Mesozoic ammonite fauna in the Pilot Mountains of Nevada under the direction of James Perrin Smith. Muller began teaching as an instructor at Stanford while still a graduate student. He was named an assistant professor in 1930, was promoted to associate professor in 1936 (the year of his election as fellow of the Geological Society of America), and became full professor in 1941.

In 1928, Muller made an initial identification of the ichthyosaur fossils found near Berlin, Nevada, although full excavations were not done until much later. Before and after World War II, Muller worked extensively with Henry G. Ferguson doing geological mapping in west-central Nevada (along with Ralph Roberts and Stanley H. Cathcart); this resulted in the publication of seven USGS geology quadrangle maps between 1951 and 1954. During World War II, Muller worked for the USGS Military Geology Unit, where he studied frozen terrains such as Alaska; his Russian language skills enabled him to read the extensive Russian scientific literature on the subject. Muller is generally credited with coining the word "permafrost".

In 1976, Muller Mountain in Mineral County, Nevada, was named after Siemon Muller to commemorate his work in the area.

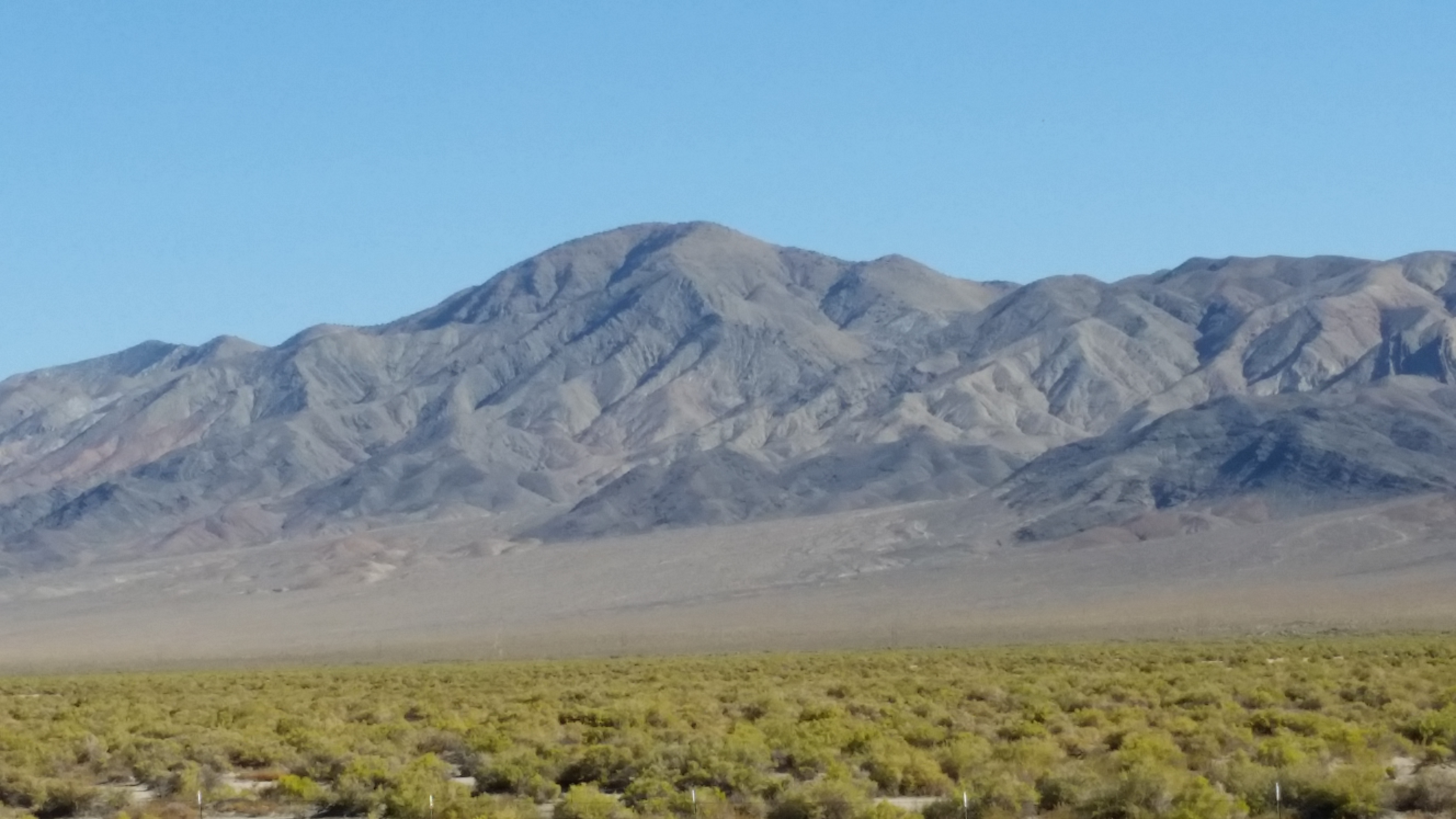
Muller Mountain, near Luning, NV

Upon Muller's retirement from Stanford in 1965, he was granted emeritus status. On September 9, 1970, he died quietly in his sleep at the Stanford campus.

== Selected publications ==
- Muller, SW (1936). "Triassic Coral Reefs in Nevada". American Journal of Science. 31 (183): 202–208. Bibcode:1936AmJS...31..202M. doi:10.2475/ajs.s5-31.183.202.
- Muller, SW; Ferguson, HG (1936). "Triassic and Jurassic Formations of West-Central Nevada". Geological Society of America Bulletin. 47 (2): 241–251. doi:10.1130/GSAB-47-241.
- Muller, SW; Ferguson, HG (1939). "Mesozoic Stratigraphy of the Hawthorne and Tonopah Quadrangles, Nevada". Geological Society of America Bulletin. 50 (210): 1573–1624. Bibcode:1939GSAB...50.1573M. doi:10.1130/GSAB-50-1573.
- Muller, SW (1945). Permafrost or permanently frozen ground and related engineering problems (Strategic engineering study, Special Report #62). US Army Engineers (reprinted 1947 by JW Edwards, Ann Arbor, MI).
- Ferguson, HG; Muller, SW (1949). Structural Geology of the Hawthorne and Tonopah Quadrangles, Nevada (USGS Professional Paper #216 (PDF). United States Geological Survey.
- Ferguson, HG; Muller, SW; Cathcart, SH (1953). Geology of the Coaldale Quadrangle, Nevada (US Geological Survey Quadrangle Map GQ23). United States Geological Survey.
- Muller, SW (2008). French, Hugh; Nelson, Frederick (eds.). Permafrost and Engineering Problems. American Society of Civil Engineers.
