= Levi F. Noble =

American geologist (1882–1965)

Levi Fatzinger Noble
- Born: November 11, 1882; Auburn, New York
- Died: August 4, 1965 (aged 82); Los Angeles, California
- Education: Yale University
- Scientific career
- Fields: geology
- Workplaces: United States Geological Survey

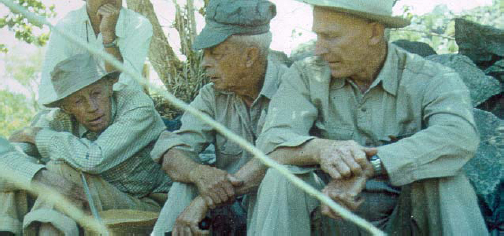
Levi F. Noble (left) with Henry G. Ferguson (center) and James Gilluly (right), 1950s.

Levi Fatzinger Noble (November 11, 1882 – August 4, 1965) was an American geologist. His entire career was spent as a member of the United States Geological Survey (USGS). Noble is largely known for his work in the American southwest, particularly as a pioneer geologist in the Death Valley region.

== Early life ==
Noble was born in 1882 into a prominent and wealthy family of Auburn, New York. He received his bachelor's degree from Yale University in 1905 and his PhD in geology in 1909, also from Yale. Shortly after receiving his doctorate he was appointed to the USGS; being independently wealthy, he received only a token salary, and was largely permitted to select his own projects.

In 1910, Noble married Dorothy Evans of Pittsburgh, Pennsylvania. As a wedding gift, Dorothy's parents gave them a fruit ranch near Valyermo, California, at the foot of the north slope of the San Gabriel Mountains and athwart the San Andreas Fault zone. The ranch was their principal residence for the rest of their lives.

== Geological career ==
Noble's initial investigations (including his PhD thesis) were in the Grand Canyon of Arizona. His PhD research included studies of Precambrian and Paleozoic rocks of the Grand Canyon. For the USGS, he prepared a detailed geologic map of the Shinumo quadrangle, which is part of Grand Canyon National Park. During this research, he demonstrated great skill in climbing, traversing the canyon between the river and the rim in multiple locations (without trails) to measure the stratigraphic sections.

In his Death Valley field investigations, which began in 1917 and continued off and on for 45 years, he observed and accurately recorded most of the major geologic features of Death Valley. Noble mapped an 8000 square mile area, assisted by Donald Curry and Thomas Thayer. His early Death Valley work reported on nitrate deposits, motivated by World War I requirements for gunpowder. Later work addressed colemanite(borate) deposits, both in Shoshone and elsewhere. His 1926 paper on the Shoshone colemanite deposits described the first evidence for Lake Manly in Death Valley, based on observed strand lines. Much of his Death Valley work was published in his much-cited 1941 paper "Structural Features of the Virgin Spring area", which described and interpreted a geological feature which he named the "Amorgosa chaos"; the Amorgosa chaos is still a topic of geological research.

Around 1950, Noble started working with both Lauren Wright and Bennie Troxel, who later became prominent Death Valley geologists. Revised interpretations of part of Noble's 1941 paper were included in a 1954 chapter co-written with Lauren Wright.

During World War II, Noble worked with the USGS Military Geology Unit. His working knowledge of the Russian and Japanese languages enabled him to read geologic maps and reports in those languages.

Noble also engaged in a long-term investigation of a fifty-mile segment of the southern San Andreas Fault on the north side of the San Gabriel Mountains. In a 1926 paper, Noble was one of the first geologists to cite evidence for large horizontal displacement (38 kilometers) along this fault; this was a radical proposal at the time and was not accepted by most geologists. Later research by other geologists has now established movement of hundreds of kilometers on the San Andreas Fault. Additional work in the area resulted in his USGS geologic maps of the Pearland and Valyermo quadrangles.

Noble was awarded the Interior Department's gold medal for distinguished service when he retired in 1951. He continued his affiliation with the USGS until his death in 1965. In 1961, the borate mineral nobleite was named after him.

== Publications ==
- "Contributions to the geology of the Grand Canyon, Arizona – The geology of the Shinumo area" American Journal of Science, 4th ser., v. 29, p. 369-386. (1910)
- "The Grand Canyon of the Colorado" Science v. 34, p. 378-380. (1911)
- "The Shinumo quadrangle, Grand Canyon district, Arizona" U.S. Geological Survey Bulletin 549 (1914)
- "A reconnaissance of the Archean complex of the Granite Gorge, Grand Canyon, Arizona": with J.F. Hunter. U.S. Geological Survey Professional Paper 98-I, p. 95-113. (1916)
- "Geologic history of the Bright Angel quadrangle, Arizona": Text on back of topographic sheet, Bright Angel quadrangle, Arizona (Coconino County): U.S. Geological Survey. (1918)
- "A section of the Paleozoic formations of the Grand Canyon at Bass Trail": U.S. Geological Survey Professional Paper 131-B, p. 23-73. (1922)
- "Colemanite in Clark County, Nevada": U.S. Geological Survey Bulletin 735, p. 23-39. (1922)
- "Nitrate deposits in the Amargosa region, southeastern California": with G.R. Mansfield and others. U.S. Geological Survey Bulletin 724, 99 p. (1922)
- "Borate deposits in the Kramer district, Kern County, California": U.S. Geological Survey Bulletin 785, p. 45-61. (1926)
- "Note on a colemanite deposit near Shoshone, California, with a sketch of the geology of a part of the Amargosa Valley": U.S. Geological Survey Bulletin 785, p. 63-73. (1926)
- "The San Andreas rift and some other active faults in the desert region of southeastern California": Carnegie Institute of Washington, Yearbook 25, p. 415-422. (1926)
- The San Andreas rift and some other active faults in the desert region of southeastern California": Seismological Society of America Bulletin, v. 17, p. 25-39. (1927)
- "The San Andreas rift in a part of southern California": Third Pan-Pacific Science Congress, Tokyo, 1926, Proceedings, p. 394-400. (1928)
- "A section of the Kaibab limestone in Kaibab Gulch, Utah": U.S. Geological Survey Professional Paper 150, p. 41-60. (1928)
- "Nitrate deposits in southeastern California, with notes on deposits in southeastern Arizona and southwestern New Mexico": U.S. Geological Survey Bulletin 820 (1931)
- "The San Andreas rift in the desert region of southern California": Carnegie Institute of Washington, Yearbook 31, p. 355-363. (1932)
- "Excursion to the San Andreas Fault and Cajon Pass, in Gale, H. S., ed., Southern California": 16th International Geological Congress, Guidebook 15 (1933)
- "Structural features of the Virgin Spring area, Death Valley, California": Geological Society of America Bulletin, v. 52, p. 941-1000. (1941)
- "Geology of the Pearland quadrangle, California": U.S. Geological Survey, Geologic Quadrangle Map GQ 24. (1953)
- "Geology of the Valyermo quadrangle, California": U.S. Geological Survey Geologic Quadrangle Map GQ 50. (1954)
- "The San Andreas Fault zone from Soledad Pass to Cajon Pass, California", in Jahns, R. H., ed., Geology of Southern California: California Division of Mines Bulletin 170, chapter IV, p. 37-48. (1954)
- "Geology of the central and southern Death Valley region, California," with L.A. Wright. in Jahns, R. H., ed., Geology of Southern California: California Division of Mines Bulletin 170, chapter II, p. 143-160. (1954)

== See also ==
- Geology of the Death Valley area
- Geology of the Grand Canyon area
- Henry G. Ferguson
