= James Gilluly =

American geologist

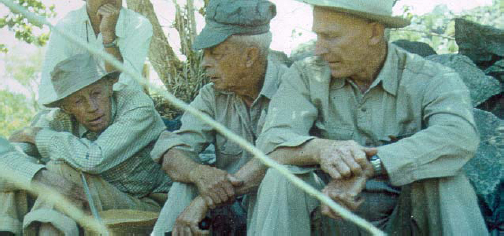
Gilluly (right) with Henry G. Ferguson (center) and Levi F. Noble (left), 1950s.

James Gilluly (June 24, 1896 – December 29, 1980) was an American geologist.

Regarding the Cupriferous Porphyry Genesis, Gilluly integrated detailed observations of the Ajo porphyry between 1936 and 1936 with experimental data (Goranson, 1931, Gilluly, 1937). Gilluly concluded that after the Ajo quartz monzonite intruded and crystallized, it was fractured by magmatic bypass solutions (p. 73). Gilluly frequency experimental restrictions to estimate a paleo depth between 1000 and 3000 (m) (average 2000 (m) or 0.5 kbar at lithostatic pressure), consistent with solidus temperatures of 900 °C for granite, containing 4% by weight of water. He realized that the source magmatic content was water, sulfur and halogens, and that the binders can form complexes with metals to produce an aqueous fluid with larger volumes. On the other hand, one can also count on the fact that volatiles decrease the solubility of water in magma and the vapor pressure of expelled fluid could fracture the wedge-shaped dome made of country rock and solidified magma. This is summarized in the discharges of magmatic fluids corresponding to continuous processes that lead to the accumulation of fluids in intercourse, which maintains an intermittent fracturing., The influence of Geochemical Techniques on the Development of Genetic Models for Porphyry Copper Deposits, published in the Vol. 10 of the Reviews in Economic Geology de la Society of Economic Geologists.

== Life and career ==
Gilluly's paternal grandfather was a follower of Robert Emmett who left County Galway for the United States in 1793. Gilluly's paternal ancestors lived in the state of New York, and subsequently moved to Michigan and Kansas before settling in the state of Washington. His maternal ancestors arrived in the United States in 1830, from Württemberg in Germany. They lived in East St. Louis prior to Kittitas County, Washington. James Gilluly was born to Charles Elijah Gilluly and Louisa Elizabeth Briegel Gilluly in Seattle on June 24, 1896. He played American football in high school and graduated first in his class. Gilluly enrolled at the University of Washington in 1915, where he explored the study of engineering and economics before focusing on geology. After serving in the United States Navy between 1917 and 1918, Gilluly completed his bachelor's degrees in 1920. Upon graduation, Gilluly began working for the National Refining Company. He then worked in insurance before joining the United States Geological Survey on a part-time basis in 1922. Gilluly concurrently enrolled in graduate study at Johns Hopkins University, and later transferred to Yale University, where he earned a doctorate in 1925. Gilluly engaged in field work throughout the United States on behalf of the USGS until 1931, when the agency sent him to Europe. Starting in 1938, Gilluly split his time between the USGS and the University of California, Los Angeles. He moved to Los Angeles in 1940, but was soon recalled to work mainly on strategic minerals for the Geological Survey as part of the World War II effort. In 1944, Gilluly accepted a transfer to the Military Geology Unit, through which he was assigned to the South West Pacific Command. Gilluly researched the terrain in Australia, New Guinea, and the Philippines. The Battle of Leyte that took place in October began at a landing site Gilluly selected. He arrived on the island with United States Marines forces. Gilluly returned to UCLA in 1945. He found the institution's bureaucratic nature intolerable, and resigned from the faculty in 1950, in the midst of the Second Red Scare. Gilluly retired from the USGS in 1966. His doctoral students include John C. Crowell.

In 1947, Gilluly was elected to the National Academy of Sciences. The next year, he served as president of the Geological Society of America, and was awarded the GSA's Penrose Medal in 1958. He was a Guggenheim Fellowship recipient in 1960, and won the Walter H. Bucher Medal awarded by the American Geophysical Union in 1969. Gilluly died in Denver, Colorado, on December 29, 1980, aged 84.

== Selected publications ==
Gilluly, J, and Reeside, JB. 1928. Sedimentary Rocks of the San Rafael Swell and Some Adjacent Areas in Eastern Utah. USGS Professional Paper 150-D.

Roberts, RJ, Hotz, PE, Gilluly, J, and Ferguson, HG. 1958. Paleozoic Rocks of North-Central Nevada. AAPG Bulletin, v 42, #12, pp 2813–2857.

Gilluly, J. 1969. Oceanic Sediment Volumes and Continental Drift. Science, v 166, pp 992–994.

Gilluly, J. 1971. Plate Tectonics and Magmatic Evolution, GSA Bulletin, v 82, pp 2382–2396. Reprinted in Cox, Allan (ed). 1973. Plate Tectonics and Geomagnetic Reversals. WH Freeman and Company.
