= Frank Frakes =

Frank Frakes (1860-1933) was a pioneer rancher in the Antelope Valley in Southern California.

== Early life ==
Born in Adel, Iowa, Frank Frakes moved to California in 1875 to join his uncle Samuel H. T. Frakes (1834-1911). Samuel Frakes had moved to California from Iowa in 1849 and finally settled in the Antelope Valley with his wife Almeda Mudgett Frakes (1838-1934) and son William Franklin Frakes, living first in Del Sur, California and then finally Elizabeth Lake (Los Angeles County, California).

== Antelope Valley ==
Uncle and nephew eventually homesteaded on the shores of Elizabeth Lake (Los Angeles County, California). The Frakes family also donated land to found the Elizabeth Lake school. In addition to running his ranch with a herd of cattle, Frank Frakes owned a store and served as Post Master of Elizabeth Lake, California in the 1880s and 1890s.

== Political life ==
Frakes served as Judge of Elections in Antelope Valley.

He received national press attention in 1911, both for distance traveled and for his sense of humor, during his interview for jury duty for the trial for the McNamara brothers who had bombed the Los Angeles Times building in 1910.

== Personal life ==
Frank Frakes married Mary Jane Humphreys (1866-1950) and had several children including Samuel Franklin Frakes, James A. Frakes, Frank B. Frakes (father of geologist Lawrence A. Frakes, the namesake of Mount Frakes in Antarctica), George H. Frakes, Samantha May Frakes, Bertha Frakes (Bittick), and Nellie Almeda Frakes.

In 1903, at the age of 43, he won the wrestling championship of the Antelope Valley.

== Legacy ==
After Frank Frakes' death, his ranch eventually became the Edgewater Park Club while the land of Samuel H. T. Frakes became the Lake Elizabeth Golf and Ranch Club. The Powerhouse Fire of 2013 destroyed the ranch house of Frank Frakes as well as his almond and fruit tree orchard.
