= Edith C. Wilson =

American lawyer

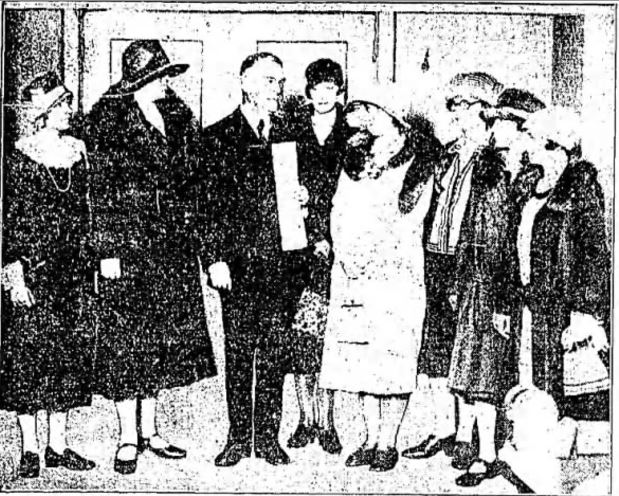
Edith C. Wilson (to the right of Judge William Langdon) in 1926

Edith Christensen Wilson (May 23, 1899 - March 27, 1980) was a prominent assistant district attorney of San Francisco, prosecuting cases in the Women's Court.

Edith Christensen was born in Oakland, California, on May 23, 1899, the daughter of Anton and Olivie Christensen. She graduated from the University of California, Berkeley.

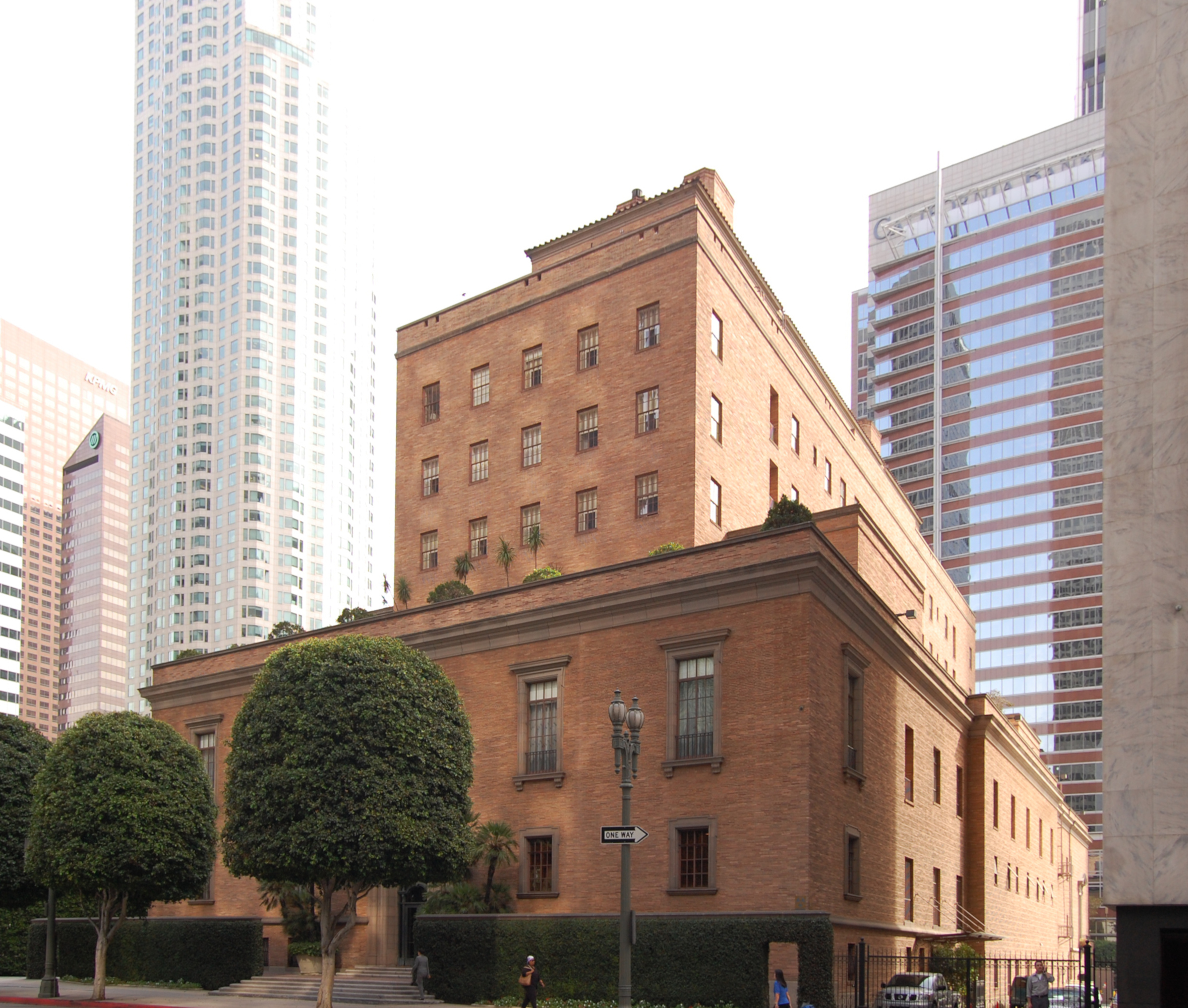
Wilson was a member of the Los Angeles-based private club California Club

Wilson was a prominent attorney at law, being associated with her husband, David Salisbury Wilson, under the firm name of Wilson & Wilson, Attorneys. She was admitted to the bar in 1926. She was assistant district attorney of San Francisco, prosecuting cases in the Women's Court.

She was a member of the Kappa Beta Pi, Native Daughters of the Golden West, California Club, Women's City Club, Lambda Omega.

She lived at 369 Pine Street, San Francisco, and later 2627 Clay Street, Oakland, California. He and her husband had one son, Bruce Wilson (born September 28, 1939).
