= Nobleite =

Phylloborate mineral

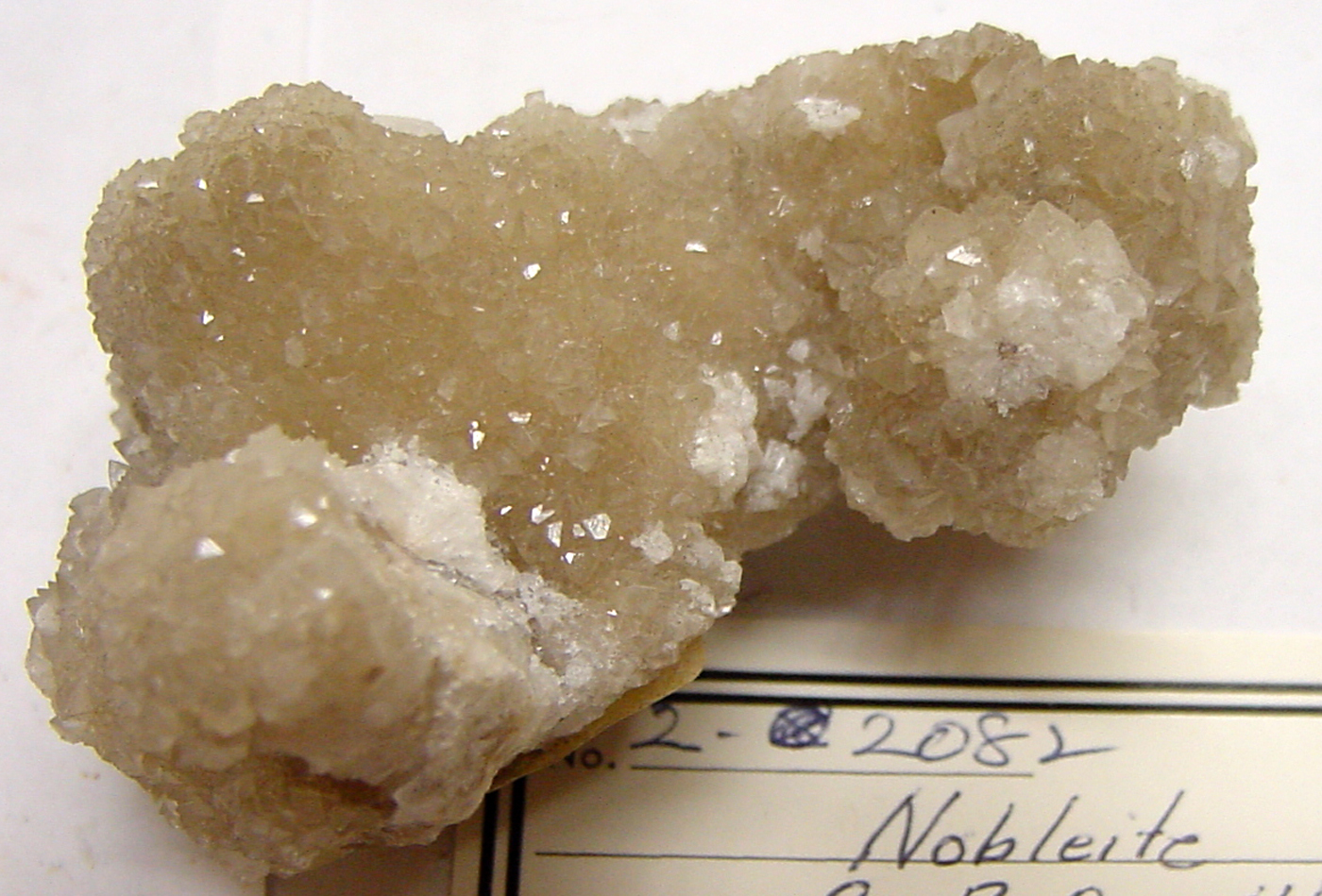
- Nobleite, Death Valley, California

General
- Category: Phylloborates
- Formula: CaB_{6}O_{9}(OH)_{2}·3H_{2}O
- IMA symbol: Nob
- Strunz classification: 6.FC.05
- Crystal system: Monoclinic
- Crystal class: Prismatic (2/m) (same H-M symbol)
- Space group: P2_{1}/a

Identification
- Luster: Vitreous
- Streak: White
- Specific gravity: 2.09
- Density: 2.09
- Ultraviolet fluorescence: Non-fluorescent
- Solubility: Slightly soluble in water

Nobleite is a rare borate mineral with the chemical formula CaB_{6}O_{9}(OH)_{2}·3H_{2}O. It was discovered in 1961, in Death Valley, California, and is named for Levi F. Noble, a USGS geologist, in honor of his contributions to the geology of the Death Valley region.

Nobleite has also been identified at two localities in Chile and Argentina.
