= Native Daughters of the Golden West =

- Founded: 1886
- Founder: Lilly O. Reichling
- Type: 501(c)(3)
- Purpose: California history and heritage
- Location: San Francisco, California, United States
- Grand President: Heidi Dillon, 2025-2026
- Website: Official website

The Native Daughters of the Golden West is an American non-profit organization for women born in California. The organization focuses on the care and preservation of California history. It is the sister organization to the Native Sons of the Golden West.

== History ==
=== Founding at Pioneer Hall ===
Pioneer Hall
- Location in California
- 38.349067°N 120.774283°W
- Location: 113 Main St., Jackson, California, United States

California Historical Landmark
- Reference no.: 34

The organization was founded in Pioneer Hall, a historic building located in Jackson, California. The first meeting took place on September 11, 1886, in the basement of the Hall. The meeting was called by Lilly O. Reichling. Approximately 20 women attended the first meeting. The hall is a California Historical Landmark. On September 25, 1886, the Order was organized with Reichling serving as Secretary. Tina L. Kane was the first President. They called their meeting space a "Parlor" and the founding group was named Ursula.

=== Ursula Parlor No. 1 ===
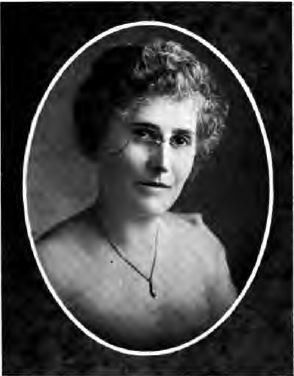
Victory A. Derrick, 1922 Grand President of the Native Daughters of the Golden West, Who's who among the women of California

On March 7, 1887, charter officers were declared. Ursula No 1. had thirty-three founding members. Their first logo featured a fawn. They changed it to include the symbols of Minerva: oriflamme and sheaves of wheat. It also had the letters "P.D.F.A." added. Their founding principles were: "Love of Home, Devotion to the Flag of our Country, Veneration of the Pioneers of California, and an Abiding Faith in the Existence of God." These principles remain today. Between March and June 1887, seventeen other Parlors were organized. In July they held their first Grand Parlor in San Francisco, California.

=== Today ===
The main San Francisco Parlor is located in a building designed by architect Julia Morgan.

== Notable members ==
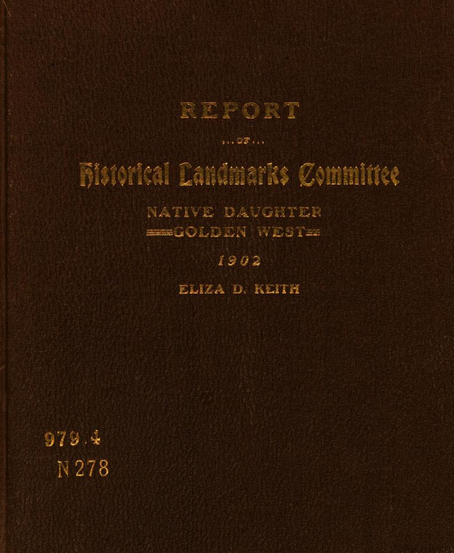
Report of Historical Landmarks Committee of the Native Daughters of the Golden West, by Eliza D. Keith

- Laura J. Frakes
- Eliza D. Keith, grand president
- Edith Christensen Wilson

== Programs ==
The organization focuses on projects that retain and support the heritage of California. This includes historic restoration of California Missions, the maintaining of the Roster of California Pioneers, scholarships, environmentalism, child welfare, and the development of historic landmarks.

== Publications ==
From 1905 through 1954 the Native Sons and Daughters of the Golden West published The Grizzly Bear.

== See also ==
- California Historical Landmarks in Amador County
