= Latady Mountains =

Group of mountains in Palmer Land, Antarctica

- Location within Antarctica

Highest point
- Coordinates: 74°45′S 64°18′W

Geography
- Region(s): Palmer Land, Antarctica

The Latady Mountains (74°45′S 64°18′W) are a group of mountains rising west of Gardner Inlet and between Wetmore Glacier and Ketchum Glacier, in southeastern Palmer Land, Antarctica.

== Location ==
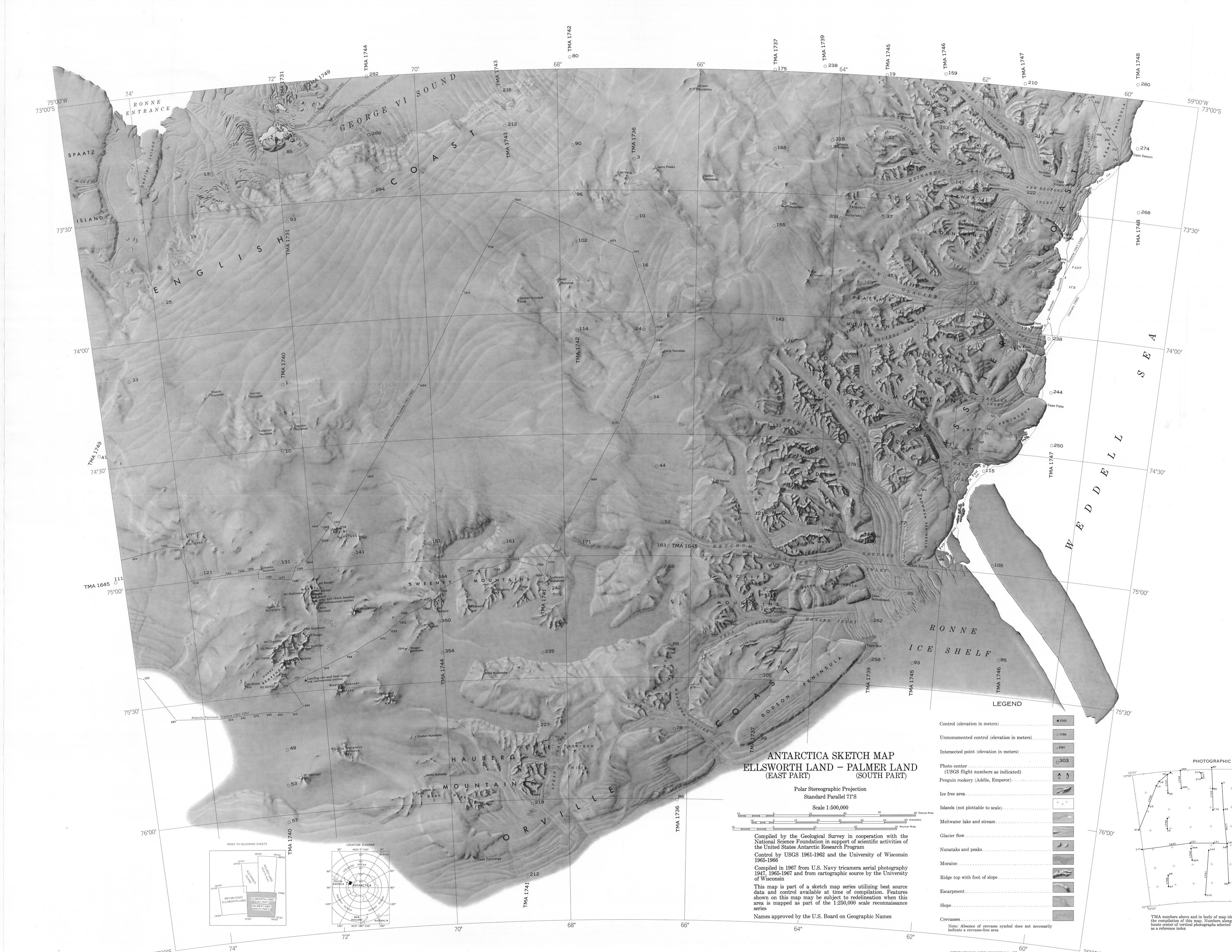
Eastern Ellsworth Land (south), Southern Palmer Land (north). Latady Mountains in center east of map.

The Latady Mountains are in the southeast of Palmer Land. They are bounded by the Wetmore Glacier to the north and east, and the Ketchum Glacier to the south. A featureless expanse of ice extends to the west as far as the Sky-Hi Nunataks. The Rare Range is to the northeast, and beyond that the Guettard Range. Features, from north to south, include Mount Aaron, McLaughlin Peak, Mount Robertson, Crain Ridge, Strange Glacier, Mount Hyatt, Mount Wood, Mount Terrazas and Schmitt Mesa. The Rare Range with Mount Crowell and Mount Sumner is to the northeast. Mount Poster and Mount Tenney are to the west.

== Exploration and name ==
The Latady Mountains were seen from the air by the Ronne Antarctic Research Expedition (RARE) on 21 November 1947 and partially surveyed by the Falkland Islands Dependencies Survey and RARE from Stonington Island in December 1947. They were photographed from the air by the United States Navy, 1965–67, and mapped from air photographs by the United States Geological Survey (USGS). They were named by RARE for William R. Latady, an aerial photographer with the expedition.

== Features ==
=== Mount Aaron ===
74°31′S 64°53′W. A mountain in the northwest part of the Latady Mountains. Mapped by USGS from ground surveys and United States Navy air photos, 1961-67. Named by the United States Advisory Committee on Antarctic Names (US-ACAN) for W.T. Aaron, electrician with the South Pole Station winter party in 1963. Not to be confused with Jebel Harun ('Mount Aaron') in Jordan.

=== McLaughlin Peak ===
74°35′S 64°18′W. A peak standing 9 nautical miles (17 km; 10 mi) east-southeast of Mount Aaron in the north part of the Latady Mountains. Mapped by USGS from surveys and United States Navy air photos, 1961-67. Named by US-ACAN for Robert H. McLaughlin, United States Navy, engineman with the South Pole Station winter party in 1964.

=== Mount Robertson ===
74°41′S 64°14′W. A mountain, 1,565 metres (5,135 ft) high, standing 20 nautical miles (37 km; 23 mi) northwest of Mount Austin and the head of Gardner Inlet. Discovered by the RARE, 1947–48, under Ronne, who named this feature for James B. Robertson, aviation mechanic with the expedition.

=== Crain Ridge ===
74°45′S 63°50′W. A ridge along the north flank of Strange Glacier. Mapped by USGS from ground surveys and United States Navy air photos, 1961-67. Named by US-ACAN for Harold D.K. Crain, utilitiesman with the South Pole Station winter party in 1967.

=== Mount Hyatt ===
74°53′S 64°47′W. A mountain in the southern part of the Latady Mountains, about 5 nautical miles (9.3 km; 5.8 mi) northwest of Schmitt Mesa. Mapped by USGS from surveys and United States Navy air photos, 1961-67. Named by US-ACAN for Gerson Hyatt, builder with the McMurdo Station winter party in 1967, who assisted in building the USARP Plateau Station at 79°15′S 40°30′E.

=== Mount Wood ===
74°51′S 64°07′W. A mountain, 1,230 metres (4,040 ft) high, standing west of Gardner Inlet and 15 nautical miles (28 km; 17 mi) west of Mount Austin. Discovered by the RARE 1947-48, under Ronne, who named this mountain for E.A. Wood, ship's engineer with the expedition.

=== Mount Terrazas ===
74°52′S 63°51′W. A prominent ridgelike mountain 10 nautical miles (19 km; 12 mi) west of Mount Austin. Mapped by USGS from surveys and United States Navy air photos, 1961-67. Named by US-ACAN for Rudolph D. Terrazas, builder at South Pole Station in 1967.

=== Schmitt Mesa ===
74°56′S 64°05′W. A prominent, mainly ice-covered mesa, 15 nautical miles (28 km; 17 mi) long and 5 nautical miles (9.3 km; 5.8 mi) wide, forming the southern rampart of Latady Mountains at the base of the Antarctic Peninsula. Mapped by USGS from surveys and United States Navy air photos, 1961-67. Named by US-ACAN for Waldo L. Schmitt, marine biologist, Honorary Research Associate of the Smithsonian Institution. Schmitt was aboard Fleurus at Deception Island in 1927. He participated in the Staten Island cruise to Marguerite Bay and Weddell Sea in the 1962-63 season.

== Nearby features ==
=== Rare Range ===
74°24′S 64°05′W. A rugged mountain range between Wetmore Glacier and Irvine Glacier. Discovered and photographed from the air by the Ronne Antarctic Research Expedition, 1947-48. Named by US-ACAN (using the initials of the Ronne expedition) in recognition of the contributions made by this expedition to knowledge of Palmer Land and the Antarctic Peninsula area.

=== Mount Crowell ===
74°20′S 64°05′W. A mountain in the north part of Rare Range. Mapped by USGS from ground surveys and United States Navy air photos, 1961-67. Named by US-ACAN for John C. Crowell, geologist at McMurdo Station, summer 1966-67.

=== Copper Nunataks ===
74°22′S 64°55′W. A cluster of nunataks 4 nautical miles (7.4 km; 4.6 mi) across, situated at the head of Wetmore Glacier, 11 nautical miles (20 km; 13 mi) west-southwest of Mount Crowell. Mapped by USGS from surveys and United States Navy tricamera aerial photography, 1961-67. The name was given by Peter D. Rowley, USGS geologist to this area (1970–71; 1972–73), who reported that the nunataks contain the largest known copper deposits in Antarctica.

=== Mount Sumner ===
74°30′S 63°45′W. A mountain at the southeast end of the Rare Range. Mapped by USGS from surveys and United States Navy air photos, 1961-67. Named by US-ACAN for Joseph W. Sumner, utilitiesman at South Pole Station in 1964.

=== Mount Poster ===
74°41′S 65°39′W. A mountain lying west of the Latady Mountains and 9 nautical miles (17 km; 10 mi) northwest of Mount Tenney. Mapped by USGS from surveys and United States Navy air photos, 1961-67. Named by US-ACAN for Carl K. Poster, geophysicist with the USARP South Pole-Queen Maud Land Traverse III, summer 1967-68.

=== Mount Tenney ===
74°49′S 65°19′W. A mountain located west of Latady Mountains, 9 nautical miles (17 km; 10 mi) northwest of Mount Hyatt, at the base of Antarctic Peninsula. Mapped by USGS from surveys and United States Navy air photos, 1961-67. Named by US-ACAN for Philip J. Tenney, traverse engineer on the South Pole-Queen Maud Land Traverse III, summer 1967-68.

== Sources ==
- Alberts, Fred G., ed. (1995), Geographic Names of the Antarctic (PDF) (2 ed.), United States Board on Geographic Names This article incorporates public domain material from websites or documents of the United States Board on Geographic Names.
- Ellsworth Land - Palmer Land, USGS: United States Geological Survey
- Latady Mountains, AADC: Australian Antarctic Data Centre

This article incorporates public domain material from websites or documents of the United States Geological Survey.
