= Eliza D. Keith =

American journalist

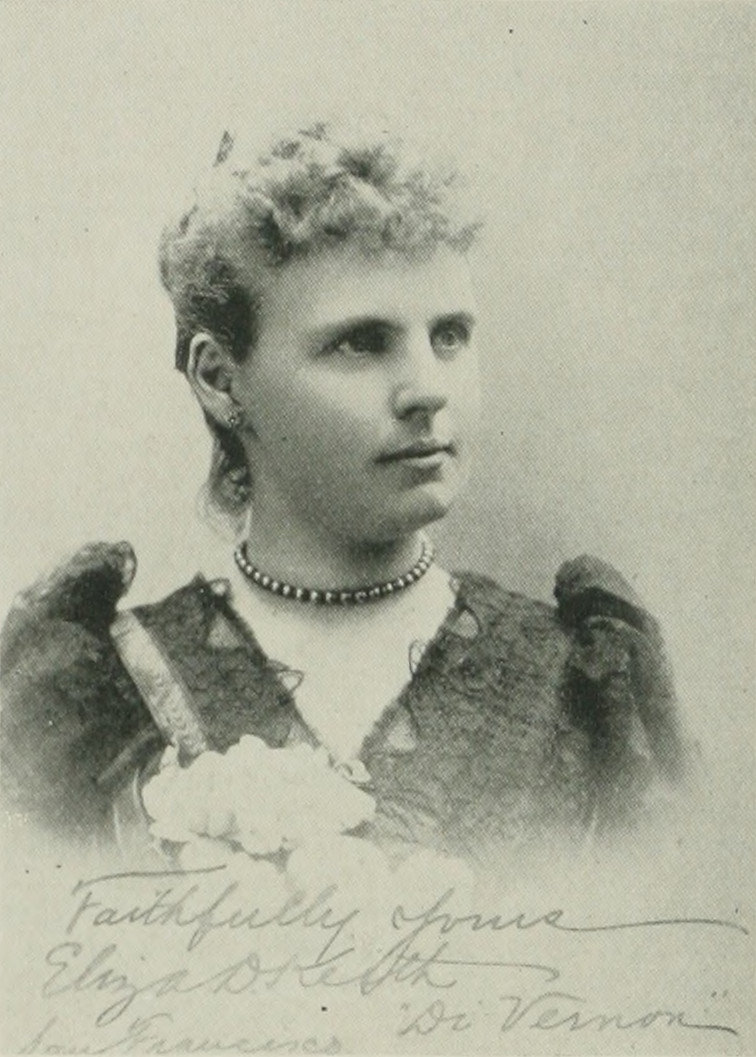
- Photo in A Woman of the Century
- Born: Eliza Douglas Keith; 1854; San Francisco, California, U.S.
- Died: November 6, 1939 (aged 84–85); San Francisco
- Education: San Francisco Girls' High School
- Occupations: educator; author; journalist; reformer
- Writing career
- Pen name: Erle Douglas; Di Vernon
- Language: English
- Notable awards: Bronze medal, San Francisco Society for the Prevention of Cruelty to Animals

Signature
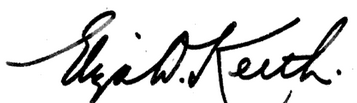

Eliza Douglas Keith (pen names, Erle Douglas and Di Vernon; 1854 – November 6, 1939) was an American educator, author, and journalist; she was also a social reformer and activist. A suffragist, she was an original member, secretary and treasurer of the Susan B. Anthony Club founded immediately after the defeat of equal suffrage in California in 1896. She served as grand president, Native Daughters of the Golden West. The San Francisco Society for the Prevention of Cruelty to Animals honored her with a bronze medal. Keith believed in practical patriotism and an earnest effort to rescue the U.S. flag from desecration. She was the first teacher to introduce the salute to the American flag as part of the regular opening exercises each day in the classroom. Keith was a member of the Golden Gate Kindergarten Association.

Her work appeared in Demorest's Monthly Magazine, Good Housekeeping, The Daily Alta California, San Francisco Chronicle, San Francisco Examiner, The San Francisco Call, and the San Francisco News Letter. She was a special correspondent of the San Francisco Recorder-Union, the Journalist, and Kate Field's Washington. On several occasions, Keith acted as special correspondent for the Sacramento Record Union, representing that paper at the World's Columbian Exposition. Her best-known work was the "Snap Shots" department in the San Francisco News Letter, and her weekly letters on California matters to the Boston Journalist. She was a member of the Pacific Coast Women's Press Association and the Illinois Press League.

== Early life and education ==
Eliza Douglas Keith was born in San Francisco, California, 1854. Her parents were William Henry Keith and Sarah Ann Atwill (1836–1924). Her maternal grandfather, Joseph Fairfield Atwill (1811–1891), had been a music publisher in New York City, but traveled to California in 1849 as an "Argonaut of '49" and became a prominent public officer. Two of his brothers were editors. Keith's father, William, was a well-known chemist of San Francisco, who had been tester of coinage in the California mint, and also deputy collector of the port of San Francisco. Keith was of New England and Knickerbocker descent. Her middle name, Douglas, is an updated spelling of the surname of her maternal grandmother, Eliza A. Dugliss (1814–1903).

Early in life, Keith's parents detected her literary talents and determined to give her as good an education as the Pacific coast could afford at that time. A very bright child, she could read at the age of six and could also write. Before she was seven years old, she had made up her mind to make literature her profession. Keith published her first work at the age of 13.

She was a graduate of the San Francisco Girls' High School.

== Career ==
=== Educator ===
After finishing her education, Keith became a principal of the Sherman School in San Francisco.

In 1890, she was elected life member of the Golden Gate Kindergarten Association.

During the period of 1913–14, Keith wrote a column, "The School Teachers' Page" for the Western Journal of Education.

=== Writer and journalist ===
Keith was a contributor to the daily and weekly press, as well as the amateur press from 1879. These were principally poems, such as "A Fragment". But her best work in amateur journalism was in the form of extended sketches. Her first production of this kind, entitled "Through a Thermometer", was published in pamphlet form by Philip I. Figel in 1882. A sketch written in 1886, entitled "Did She Care For Him?", also published by Figel in pamphlet form, was considered an improvement though it was not a very original love story.

While in school she had already written some verses, and she continued to send occasional poems to the papers. One of these, entitled “Our Flag,” written during the Civil War, demonstrated her strong poetical talents. She became connected with the Alta Californian, the Chronicle, the Examiner, and the Call, of San Francisco, both as a space writer and a contributor of special articles, usually without signature.

Recognizing that anonymity made her known only in a limited circle, she adopted the nom de plume of "Erie Douglas", contributing poetical charades to the puzzle columns of the weekly papers and winning prizes in contests for the best essays. She wrote poems of humor for the Wasp, and edited the "Snap Shots" department for the San Francisco News Letter.

She became better known over another signature, "Di Vernon", contributing all over the Pacific coast and to Eastern periodicals, as her notability extended. These included Demorest's Monthly Magazine, Good Housekeeping, and others devoted to the interests of women. She wrote many short stories. Under "Di Vernon", she served as special writer for the Alta Californian, San Francisco Chronicle, Examiner, News Letter, and Call. She was a special correspondent of the San Francisco Recorder-Union, while also writing for the Journalist, Kate Field's Washington, and other periodicals. She served as associate editor of the Household Realm of Cleveland, Ohio. Keith's style was characterized as "bright and sparkling, full of satire without bitterness".

Report of Historical Landmarks Committee of the Native Daughters Golden West

Outlines of California history

Keith's works included, Report of Historical Landmarks Committee of the Native Daughters Golden West (W. N. Brunt, 1902); Outlines of California history (San Francisco, W. N. Brunt Press, 1916); and Keith's outlines in astronomy and geography (Donaldson publishing company, San Francisco, 1917);

She was a member of and speaker at the gatherings of Pacific Coast Women's Press Association. She was also a member of the Illinois Press League.

=== Reformer and activist ===
Her first published article, at the age of 13, was titled "Our Flag". The importance of a Columbus Day celebration by school children was first urged by Keith upon the San Francisco public in her "Di Vernon" column of the San Francisco News Letter. She also originated the idea of patriotism among school children, to be known as "The Order of the American Flag." Keith was the first teacher to introduce the salute to the American flag as a part of the regular opening exercises each day in the classroom. Eventually, the whole school joined in the exercise. This pioneer work stimulated others.

In 1892, as a member of the Pacific Coast Women's Press Association, Keith scored a "journalistic triumph" for her comments published by the Illustrated American. This was preceded with a Fourth of July article published in the News Letter, in 1890, in which she stated: "It is treason to haul down the flag from the masthead; it is treason to degrade it in the estimation of a child." In February, 1891, she asked: "Shall the flag of our country be debased by bearing upon its fair surface an advertising device? If there be no law to prevent it, let us have one at once." In September, 1891, she delivered an address before the Pacific Coast Women's Press Association at Union Square Hall. The peroration was a patriotic outburst, calling upon Congress to protect the flag from the advertising "fiend". This was published in the Daily Report, of San Francisco, and in the New York Journalist, giving it a widespread circulation. This address also contained an exposition of "Di Vernon's" pet project, the organization of the "Order of the American Flag," a patriotic legion, among the children of America. At other times during the last few years which preceded this, Keith (as Di Vernon) made similar appeals to arouse the patriotic sentiment. So she was surprised, after picking up a copy of the Illustrated American in April 1892, to find a self-laudatory editorial, in which the paper congratulated itself that the crusade which it had inaugurated against the flag-advertising was about yield results. To claim the whole credit for that aroused Di Vernon's sense of justice. She wrote to the editor, asking the date of the "inauguration". Maurice Meyer Minton, Sr. replied in a courteous note, stating that the matter was brought up in editorials of vol. 9, page 530, dated February 6, 1892. Keith (Di Vernon) found all the dates of her patriotic articles, and in the News Letter of May 14, 1892, published a history of the whole matter, under the caption: “Honor the Flag". With characteristic directness, Di Vernon asked: "Don't you think that instead of taking the lead, you were rather late in dropping into line?" In March, 1894, she had the satisfaction of witnessing the official adoption of her patriotic idea. The San Francisco Board of Education passed a resolution that the last hour of the last Friday of each month should be given to patriotic exercises, including the salute of the flag.

Keith was especially interested in subjects pertaining to women. She served as grand president, Native Daughters of the Golden West. She was an original member, secretary and treasurer of the Susan B. Anthony Club founded immediately after the defeat of equal suffrage in California in 1896.

She was a member of the San Francisco Society for the Prevention of Cruelty to Animals, and edited a children's column in the Humane World, a monthly periodical published in Saint Paul, Minnesota, focused on the prevention of cruelty to animals.

She was also a supporter of the cause of temperance.

== Personal life ==
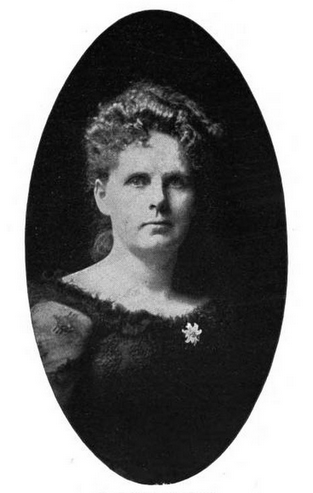
1902

She was deeply religious, and served as a teacher in a mission Sunday school.

Eliza Douglas Keith died in San Francisco, November 6, 1939.

== Awards and honors ==
In October 1891, she received the bronze medal of the San Francisco Society for the Prevention of Cruelty to Animals, in recognition of service rendered to the cause of humane education through her lectures and writing.

== Selected works ==
- 1902, Report of Historical Landmarks Committee of the Native Daughters Golden West
- 1910, Digest of decisions : N.D.G.W.
- 1916, Outlines of California history : westward the course of empire takes its way
