= Mount Rees (Marie Byrd Land) =

Mountain in Marie Byrd Land, Antarctica

Mount Rees (76°40′S 118°10′W) is a 2,709 metres (8,888 ft) mountain located 7 nautical miles (13 km) northwest of Mount Steere in the northern end of Crary Mountains, Marie Byrd Land. It was mapped by the U.S. Geological Survey from ground surveys and U.S. Navy air photos, 1959–66, and was named for Manfred H. Rees, aurora scientist at Byrd Station during the 1965–66 season.

It is a shield volcano formed during the late Miocene to early Pliocene. The 1967-1968 Marie Byrd Land Survey found lichen on Mount Rees, but no other traces of life.

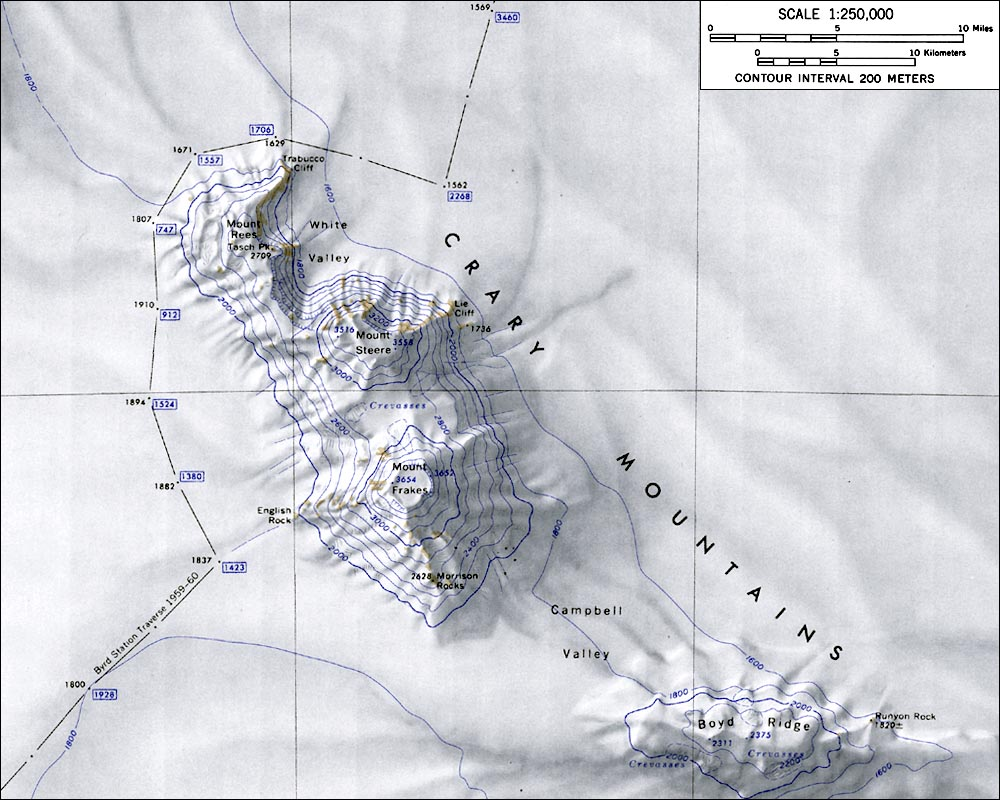
Map of the Crary Mountains. Mount Rees is located in the northern end of the range.
