= John C. Crowell =

John J. Chambers Crowell (May 12, 1917, State College, Pennsylvania – May 13, 2015, Montecito, California) was an American professor of geology, known for his research in tectonics, sedimentation, and the geology of California, especially his studies of the San Andreas Fault.

== Education and career ==
Born in Pennsylvania and the son of a father who became a professor of Romance languages at Claremont Colleges, John Crowell went to high school in Los Angeles County, California, and graduated from the University of Texas at Austin in 1939 with a degree in geology. He then matriculated as a graduate student in geology at the University of California, Los Angeles (UCLA). During his study of the geology of part of the San Joaquin Valley, he was offered employment as a geologist by the Shell Oil Company. He briefly worked for that company before the United States entered WW II. He joined the U.S. Army, was given intensive training as an oceanographic meteorologist, and in May 1943 was commissioned a second lieutenant. He became a member of Operation Overlord's weather forecasting team. For his role in predicting weather and surf conditions for the June 6th 1944 D-Day invasion, Crowell was awarded a Bronze Star Medal. In the autumn of 1944, in preparation for the Burma campaign of 1944–1945, he was based in Ceylon and was one of the leaders of a U.S. Army convoy across the Ledo Road from India into China. In 1945 he became stationed in Manila and was assigned to work on the planned invasion of Japan. Upon the end of WW II, he returned to the United States and in 1946 met and married Betty Marie Bruner (1920–2007) in Los Angeles County. Their daughter Martha (nicknamed "Marty") was born in 1951.

John C. Crowell graduated in 1946 with an MA in oceanographic meteorology from Scripps Institution of Oceanography and in 1947 with a PhD in geology from UCLA. His Ph.D. dissertation Geology of the Tejon Pass region, California was supervised by James Gilluly. At UCLA Crowell was a professor of geology for 20 years and then in 1966 joined the faculty of the University of California, Santa Barbara (UCSB). With Preston Cloud, he founded the UCSB Environmental Studies Program. Crowell taught structural geology and tectonics (including field studies in tectonics) at UCSB, as well as short courses all over the world for the Continuing Education Program of the American Association of Petroleum Geologists (AAPG). In many different countries, he and his graduate students conducted field studies in deserts and mountain ranges. He remained a professor at UCSB until his retirement as professor emeritus. His doctoral students include Lawrence A. Frakes.

== Research ==
Crowell did research on sedimentation, tectonics, paleoclimatology, and California's geology. In the early and mid 1950s he published results on the origins of submarine canyons and turbidity currents. He studied flysch in California and in the Alps. In the 1950s and 1960s he published papers on the displacement history, including kinematics, sedimentation, and tectonics, of the San Gabriel Fault and the southern part of the San Andreas Fault. His research on the San Andreas Fault guided his subsequent research on the geology of similar tectonic belts in the North Sea region, the Alps, the Caribbean region, Southeast Asia, and Australia. He did important research on pull-apart basins and the origins of pebbly mudstone. In the late 1960s Crowell and his colleagues investigated ancient glaciations in Europe, North American, and on all of the Gondwanan continents and elucidated the histories and causes of continental glaciation.

== Awards and honors ==
Crowell was a Guggenheim Fellow for the academic year 1953–1954. He was elected in 1980 a Member of the American Academy of Arts and Sciences and in 1981 a Member of the National Academy of Sciences. He received an honorary doctorate from the University of Louvain. He received in 1995 the Penrose Medal of the Geological Society of America and in 2013 the Lifetime Achievement Award of the Society for Sedimentary Geology (previously known as the Society of Economic Paleontologists and Mineralogists). In his honor, a mountain, mapped in the 1960s, is named Mount Crowell, which is located in Antarctica's Rare Range (a mountain range named for the Ronne Antarctic Research Expedition).

== Family ==
John Crowell's wife died in 2007 after 61 years of marriage. Upon his death in 2015 he was survived by his daughter, two grandchildren, and two great-grandchildren — all of whom were living in Santa Cruz, California.

== Selected publications ==
- Crowell, John C. (November 1955). "Directional-current structures from the Prealpine Flysch, Switzerland". GSA Bulletin. 66 (11): 1351–1384. doi:10.1130/0016-7606(1955)66[1351:DSFTPF]2.0.CO;2.
- Crowell, John C. (August 1957). "Origin of pebbly mudstones". GSA Bulletin. 68 (8): 993–1010. doi:10.1130/0016-7606(1957)68[993:OOPM]2.0.CO;2.
- Crowell, John C. (1962). "Displacement Along the San Andreas Fault, California". 71 : Displacement Along the San Andreas Fault, California. Geological Society of America Special Papers. Vol. 71. pp. 1–58. doi:10.1130/SPE71-p1. online text
- Frakes, Lawrence A.; Crowell, John C. (June 1969). "Late Paleozoic Glaciation: I, South America". GSA Bulletin. 80 (6): 1007–1042. doi:10.1130/0016-7606(1969)80[1007:LPGISA]2.0.CO;2.
- Crowell, John C.; Frakes, Lawrence A. (October 1972). "Late Paleozoic Glaciation: Part V, Karroo Basin, South Africa". GSA Bulletin. 83 (10): 2887–2919. doi:10.1130/0016-7606(1972)83[2887:LPGPVK]2.0.CO;2.
- Crowell, J. C. (September 1973). "Chapter. Problems concerning the San Andreas fault system in southern California". In Kovach, Robert L.; Nur, Amos (eds.). Proceedings of the Conference on Tectonic Problems of the San Andreas Fault System. Stanford University Publications, Geological Sciences, Volume XIII. School of Earth Sciences, Stanford University. pp. 125–134.
- Crowell, John C. (1974). "Chapter. Sedimentation Along the San Andreas Fault, California". In Dott, Robert H.; Shaver, Robert H. (eds.). Modern and Ancient Geosynclinal Sedimentation. SEPM Special Publications No. 19. Society of Economic Paleontologists and Mineralogists. pp. 292–303. doi:10.2110/pec.74.19.0292. ISBN 978-1-56576-149-0; symposium volume containing the text of papers presented at the Kay Conference held in Madison, Wisconsin, November 1972; title page
- Frakes, Lawrence A.; Kemp, Elizabeth M.; Crowell, John C. (April 1975). "Late Paleozoic Glaciation: Part VI, Asia". GSA Bulletin. 86 (4): 454–464. Bibcode:1975GSAB...86..454F. doi:10.1130/0016-7606(1975)86<454:LPGPVA>2.0.CO;2.
- Crowell, J. C. (1979). "The San Andreas fault system through time". Journal of the Geological Society. 136 (3): 293–302. Bibcode:1979JGSoc.136..293C. doi:10.1144/gsjgs.136.3.0293.
- Crowell, J. C. (1983). "Ice ages recorded on Gondwanan continents". South African Journal of Geology. 86 (3): 237–262.
- Crowell, John C. (1983). "The recognition of ancient glaciations". Proterozoic Geology: Selected Papers from an International Proterozoic Symposium. Geological Society of America Memoirs. Vol. 161. pp. 289–298. doi:10.1130/MEM161-p289.
- Caputo, Mario V.; Crowell, John C. (August 1985). "Migration of glacial centers across Gondwana during Paleozoic Era". GSA Bulletin. 96 (8): 1020–1036. Bibcode:1985GSAB...96.1020C. doi:10.1130/0016-7606(1985)96<1020:MOGCAG>2.0.CO;2.
- Crowell, John C. (January 1986). "Chapter 1. Active tectonics along the western continental margin of the conterminous United States". Active Tectonics: Impact on Society. National Academies Press. pp. 20–29. ISBN 978-0-309-03638-2. LCCN 85032026.
- Crowell, John C. (1987). "The Tectonically Active Margin of the Western U.S.A." Episodes. 10 (4): 278–282. doi:10.18814/epiiugs/1987/v10i4/010.
- Crowell, J. C. (1995). "The Ending of the Late Paleozoic Ice Age During the Permian Period". In Scholle, Peter A.; Peryt, Tadeusz M.; Ulmer-Scholle, Dana S. (eds.). The Permian of Northern Pangea. Berlin; Heidelberg: Springer. pp. 62–74. doi:10.1007/978-3-642-78593-1_5. ISBN 978-3-642-78595-5.
