= Laura J. Frakes =

American educator

Laura J. Frakes was an American educator and civic worker, and the grand secretary of the Native Daughters of the Golden West.

== Early life ==
Laura J. Frakes was a native of California.

== Career ==
Laura J. Frakes was a very active civic worker and educator. She taught in Plumas County, California. She was a literary writer of note. She was a member of National Press Bureau.

She was one of the founders, charter member and grand secretary of Amapola Parlor, No. 80, part of the Native Daughters of the Golden West, Sutter Creek, Amador County, California.

She was the president of the Sutter Creek Women's Civic Club.

She was a member of the Order of the Eastern Star.

== Personal life ==
On December 29, 1926, in Reno, Nevada, Laura J. Frakes married James Toman, a well-known mineralogist, geologist and mining expert. She lived at Wildwood Cottage, Clear Lake Villas, Upper Lake, California.
