= Bill Frakes =

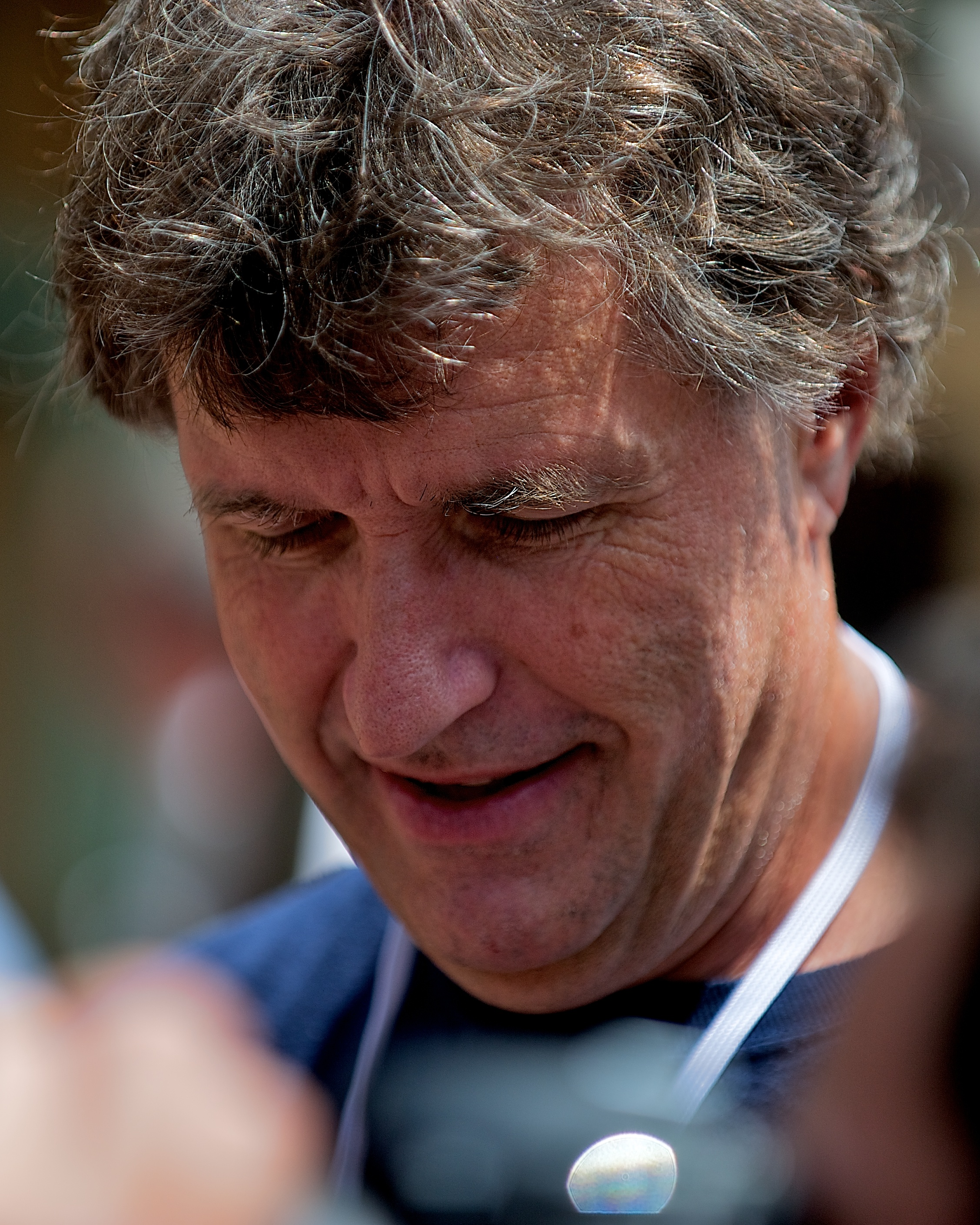

Background information
- Born: William Frakes; Nebraska, United States
- Occupations: Photographer, Director, Author
- Years active: 1979–present
- Website: www.billfrakes.com

William Frakes is an American visual storyteller and educator based in Florida.

== Work and career ==
Frakes has worked for Sports Illustrated.

He directs music videos and commercial television spots. He works with DSLR video, integrating stills, audio and video to create stories which can be viewed in multiple ways. Correlating with the 150th anniversary of Nebraska's statehood, Frakes' most recent project has focused on returning to his roots documenting his home of Nebraska in various multimedia mediums.

== Teaching ==
He has taught at the University of Miami, the University of Florida, the University of Kansas, and the University of Nebraska. Between 2005 and 2010, he lectured at more than 100 universities discussing multimedia and photojournalism. He is a photography instructor.

The University of Nebraska–Lincoln (UNL) found that Frakes engaged in sexual misconduct and sexual harassment while he was a visiting professor. Frakes was found to have made unwanted comments about women students’ bodies and clothing according to a document obtained by The Omaha World-Herald. The allegation by a female UNL student was corroborated by multiple other students. The National Press Photographers' Association noted: "The university’s office of institutional equity and compliance told the student that it found by a preponderance of the evidence that the respondent had sexually harassed the student by making unwanted sexual comments about her, and in doing so created a hostile environment for the student." Frakes appealed the claim and lost that appeal.

== Awards and honors ==
Frakes won the Newspaper Photographer of the Year award from in the Pictures of the Year International competition. He was a member of the Miami Herald staff that won the Pulitzer Prize for Public Service for their coverage of Hurricane Andrew. In 2004, he won the National Press Photographers Association (NPPA) Best of Photojournalism Award for his sports portfolio. He has also been honored by the Robert F. Kennedy Journalism Awards for reporting on the disadvantaged and by the Overseas Press Club for distinguished foreign reporting. He was awarded the Gold Medal by World Press Photo.
