= Robert Frakes =

American classics scholar

- Born: 1962 (age 63–64)
- Education: Stanford University (MA); University of California, Santa Barbara (PhD)
- Spouse: Susan
- Parent(s): George Frakes; Catherine Davies

Robert Martin Frakes (born 1962) is an American classics scholar. He is the dean of the School of Arts & Humanities at California State University, Bakersfield, where he is also a professor of history. His research concerns "political, legal, and religious history in the later Roman Empire".

== Education and career ==
Frakes grew up in Santa Barbara, California, where he became interested in classics through the mentorship of Vernon P. Ziolkowski. He is a 1984 graduate of Stanford University. After earning a master's degree and teaching certifications in Latin and Social Science through the Stanford Teacher Education Program, he graduated with a PhD in history from the University of California, Santa Barbara in 1991. His dissertation was Audience and meaning in the "Res gestae" of Ammianus Marcellinus, supervised by Harold A. Drake.

From 1991 until 2017, Frakes was a faculty member in history at Clarion University of Pennsylvania. During this time, he was also a Humboldt Research Fellow, visiting the Leopold Wenger Institute for Ancient Legal History and Papyrus Research at LMU Munich. At Clarion, he became chair of the Department of Social Sciences.

In 2017, he moved to California State University, Bakersfield as dean of the School of Arts & Humanities and professor of history.

== Personal life ==
Frakes is married to Susan Frakes, a bookbinder. He is the son of historian George Frakes and teacher and librarian Catherine Rose Kay (Davies) Frakes. Like Frakes, both of his parents were educated at Stanford University.

== Books ==
Frakes is the author or editor of several books on ancient history, as well as a college writing textbook. They include:

- Contra Potentium Iniurias: The Defensor Civitatis and Late Roman Justice (Münchener Beiträge zur Papyrusforschung und Antiken Rechtsgeschichte 90, C. H. Beck, 2001)
- Writing for College History: A Short Handbook (Cengage, 2004)
- Religious Identity in Late Antiquity (edited with Elizabeth DePalma Digeser, Edgar Kent, 2006)
- The Rhetoric of Power in Late Antiquity: Religion and Politics in Byzantium, Europe and the Early Islamic World (edited with Elizabeth DePalma Digeser and Justin Stephens, Tauris Academic Studies, 2010)
- Compiling the Collatio Legum Mosaicarum et Romanarum in Late Antiquity (Oxford: Oxford University Press, 2011)
