= Jerold Frakes =

American medieval literature scholar and editor

Jerold C. Frakes (born 1953) is a professor of medieval European literature across several languages and literatures. He studied at Memphis State University, the Universität Heidelberg, and the University of Minnesota (PhD 1982). After more than two decades in the Comparative Literature and the German departments at the University of Southern California, he moved in 2006 to the University at Buffalo, where he was appointed SUNY Distinguished Professor in 2014. He has held visiting appointments at several universities, including the Universität Heidelberg (guest professor, Seminar für die lateinische Philologie des Mittelalters und der Neuzeit, 1987), the Freie Universität Berlin (visiting faculty, Institut für Judaistik, 1997–1998), Columbia University (guest professor, Department of Germanic Languages, 2004), and the Universitetas Vilniaus (summer faculty in the Vilnius Yiddish Institute, 1999-2003 & 2014).

Frakes's published research spans numerous fields of study, especially the medieval literatures of German, English, Yiddish, Norse, and Latin, and includes monographic studies, text editions, collections of essays, and translations (from French, German, Latin, Yiddish, Norse, Hebrew and Ottoman). His publications have been recognized internationally, especially following his 1989 study, The Politics of Interpretation: Alterity and Ideology in Old Yiddish Studies. As Emmanuel Goldsmith writes, "This is a work of high scholarship and lucidity. It will become a standard in its field and will be quoted in every work on Yiddish and in many on Jewish history and literature for decades to come." In the Jewish Quarterly Review, Jürgen Biehl writes that "All . . . future historical works on Yiddish will certainly have to be seen in light of Frakes's criticism. This makes his study, with its conclusiveness of argumentation, an indispensable tool for the historian of every language, and not only those interested in Yiddish." Since 1989, Frakes's scholarship has been recognized through numerous research fellowships and prizes, among them: the Alexander von Humboldt Stiftung (1993 & 1997–1998), the National Endowment for the Humanities (2001–2002), the Radcliffe Institute for Advanced Study (2013–2014), and the John Simon Guggenheim Foundation (2013).

In 2019, Frakes received the Modern Language Association Book Prize for Early Yiddish Epic (Leviant Memorial Prize). The MLA citation reads: "In 'Early Yiddish Epic,' Jerold C. Frakes uses his vast and precise historical and philological knowledge of Old Yiddish to render the great epic texts written in that language into lucid, vivid, and compelling English prose.... 'Early Yiddish Epic' is a field-changing book in the strictest sense of that term; now that these long-neglected works are available in English translation, the study of Yiddish literature will experience a shift in its center of gravity."

Since publishing Early Yiddish Epic, Frakes has also published The Emergence of Early Yiddish Literature: Cultural Translation in Ashkenaz (2017) and A Guide to Old Literary Yiddish (2017). His current work is on language and epistemology in the works of Primo Levi.

Authored books:

- The Fate of Fortune in the Early Middle Ages: The Boethian Tradition. Leiden: E.J. Brill, 1987.
- The Politics of Interpretation: Alterity and Ideology in Old Yiddish Studies. Albany: State University of New York Press, 1989.
- Brides and Doom: Gender, Property and Power in Medieval German Women's Epic. Philadelphia: University of Pennsylvania Press, 1994.
- Vernacular and Latin Literary Discourses of the Muslim Other in Medieval Germany. New York: Palgrave, 2011.
- The Emergence of Early Yiddish Literature: Cultural Translation in Ashkenaz. Bloomington: Indiana University Press, 2017.
- A Guide to Old Literary Yiddish. Oxford: Oxford University Press, 2017.

Edited and Translated Books:

- Walter Berschin. Griechisch-lateinisches Mittelalter: Von Hieronymus zu Nikolaus von Kues. Bern: Francke, 1980. Revised ed. transl. JCF: Greek Letters and the Latin Middle Ages: from Jerome to Nicholas of Cusa. Washington: Catholic University Press, 1988.
- Max Weinreich. Geschichte der jiddischen Sprachforschung. Ed. JCF. Studies in the History of Judaism, 27. Atlanta: Scholars Press, 1993.
- Early Yiddish Texts, 1100-1750, With Introduction and Commentary/עלטערע ײִדישע טעקסטן ד'תתס–ה'תקי. Ed. JCF. Oxford: Oxford University Press, 2004.
- Jean Baumgarten. Introduction à la littérature yiddish ancienne. Paris: Cerf, 1993. Ed. and transl. JCF: Introduction to Old Yiddish Literature. Oxford: Oxford University Press, 2005.
- Yiddish Literature Division [362 articles], ed. JCF, in Encyclopaedia Judaica. 2nd edition. Michael Berenbaum and Fred Skolnik, editors-in-chief. 22 vols. New York: Macmillan, 2006.
- The Cultural Study of Yiddish in Early Modern Europe. Ed. and transl. JCF. New York: Pal-grave, 2007.
- Between Two Worlds: Yiddish-German Encounters. Ed. JCF and Jeremy A. Dauber. Studia Rosenthaliana 41. Leuven: Peeters, 2009.
- Korkut Buğday. Osmanisch-Lehrbuch: Einführung in die Grundlagen der Literatursprache. Wiesbaden: Harrassowitz, 1999. Transl. JCF: The Routledge Introduction to Literary Ottoman. New York: Routledge, 2009.
- ירושלים ד'ליטא ־ די ײִדישע קולטור אין דער ליטע / Jerusalem of Lithuania: A Cultural History of Litvak Jewry. Ed. JCF. Columbus: Ohio State University Press, 2011.
- Contextualizing the Muslim Other in Medieval Christian Discourse. Ed. JCF. New York: Pal-grave, 2011.
- Early Yiddish Epic. Transl. JCF. Syracuse: Syracuse University Press, 2014.
