= William Franklin Frakes =

American naturalist, adventurer, and writer

William Franklin Frakes (1858–1942) was an American rancher, naturalist, adventurer, and writer.

The son of pioneers Samuel H. T. Frakes and Almeda Mudgett Frakes, William Frakes grew up on their ranch at Elizabeth Lake, next to that of his cousin Frank Frakes. He studied in San Jose, probably at the forerunner of the University of the Pacific, but then left to pursue a life focused on the outdoors. He traveled to Argentina in the 1890s, where he explored the country, collected animals, and also fought off a bandit ambush (killing two of his attackers). He introduced the nutria (a large rodent species) to North America from Argentina and set up a nutria farm at his ranch in Elizabeth Lake in 1899 (with the encouragement of David Starr Jordan of Stanford University). Later some nutria escaped and went feral, with negative ecological impacts. In 1904, he also introduced quail to Santa Catalina Island, founding the quail covey there.

Frakes attempted to domesticate bighorn sheep with mixed results (and corresponded with leading naturalists about the topic and contributed some specimens to the Smithsonian Institution). He enjoyed hunting in the Antelope Valley and at his hunting cabin near Camp Cady, CA (the Mojave Desert) with his cousin William Mudgett (1877-1946) of Neenach, CA. Frakes was also a writer of nature and adventure stories.

Frakes moved to Phoenix in 1920 and died there in 1942.
