= Lawrence A. Frakes =

Lawrence Austin Frakes (born 1930) is an American-born geologist and paleoclimatologist residing in Australia since 1973. He holds (emeritus) the Douglas Mawson Professor of Geology chair, at the University of Adelaide, in South Australia. Mount Frakes, a shield volcano in the Crary Mountains of Antarctica, is named for him.

== Career ==
Frakes studied at the University of California, Los Angeles where he earned his master's degree in 1959 (with a thesis on "The geology of the Quatal Canyon area, Kern, Ventura, and Santa Barbara Counties, California") and his Ph.D. in 1964 (entitled "Paleogeography of the Trimmers Rock Member of the Fort Littleton Formation (Devonian) in southern and eastern Pennsylvania") with advisor John C. Crowell. Frakes worked at University of California, University of New Mexico, Florida State University, and later in the Department of Earth Sciences at Monash University in Australia. He was named to his position as the Douglas Mawson Professor of Geology chair, at the University of Adelaide in 1985. Professor Frakes was Chairman of the Dept. of Geology and Geophysics at the University of Adelaide from 1986-1989.

Frakes researches the relationship between continental drift and climate change. He has written a number of papers about glaciation and plate tectonics. His studies of ocean sediments helped to determine the history of glaciation, and have been published in well-respected journals, including Nature.

== Selected publications ==
- Lawrence A. Frakes; Jane E. Francis; Jozef I. Syktus (3 November 2005). Climate Modes of the Phanerozoic. Cambridge University Press. ISBN 978-0-521-02194-4.
- Lawrence A. Frakes (1979). Climates throughout geologic time. Elsevier Scientific Pub. Co. ISBN 978-0-444-41729-9.
