= Ralph J. Roberts (geologist) =

American geologist and research scientist

Ralph J. Roberts (right)

Ralph Jackson Roberts (1911–2007) was an American geologist and research scientist with the USGS. He is credited with the discovery of the Carlin and Battle Mountain Gold Belts, which make up the richest gold-mining region in Nevada as well as the United States.

== Early life ==
Roberts grew up in eastern Washington, and earned his bachelor's and master's degrees from the University of Washington in Seattle. His PhD research, which he conducted at Yale University, defined the Antler orogeny, a major mountain-building episode in the late Paleozoic.

== USGS work ==
During World War II Roberts lived in Central America, where he had been sent to discover and conduct fundamental research on strategic minerals. After the war he returned to the United States; for the next 40 years he worked in Nevada and Utah, deciphering the geologic history of major mountain ranges and exploring mineral deposits.

In 1960, Roberts published a paper that predicted the existence of important mineral-bearing rocks in Nevada. Roberts' research led to the discovery of the Carlin and Cortez-Battle Mountain gold belts. These two mining districts now represent the richest gold region in the United States, and one of the leading gold producing regions of the world.

During the 1970s he spent six years in Saudi Arabia, mapping ore deposits and contributing to the development of the Arabian mining industry. He retired from the USGS in 1981, but continued his mineral exploration in Nevada for over two decades.

== Honors and awards ==
- Distinguished Service Award from the US Department of the Interior
- Medal of Merit from the National Mining Hall of Fame
- Distinguished Service to the Minerals Industry Award from the Northwest Mining Association
- The Ralph J. Roberts Center for Research in Economic Geology at the University of Nevada was named in his honor.

== Publications ==
- Roberts, Ralph Jackson. "Quicksilver deposits of the Bottle Creek District, Humboldt County, Nevada" USGS Bulletin No. 922-A (1940)
- Roberts, Ralph Jackson. "Quicksilver deposit at Buckskin Peak National mining district, Humboldt County, Nevada" USGS Bulletin No. 922-E (1940)
- Roberts, Ralph Jackson. "Manganese deposits in Costa Rica" USGS Bulletin No. 935-H (1944)
- Roberts, Ralph Jackson. "Geology of the Antler Peak Quadrangle, Nevada". USGS Open-File Report 49-47 (1949)
- Roberts, Ralph Jackson, Irving, E.M. "Mineral deposits of Central America" USGS Bulletin No. 1034 (1957)
- Roberts, RJ, Holtz, PE, Gilluly, J, and Ferguson, HG. "Paleozoic Rocks of North-Central Nevada". AAPG Bulletin, v 42, #12, pp 2813–2857 (1958)
- Roberts, Ralph Jackson. "Stratigraphy and Structure of the Antler Peak Quadrangle, Humboldt and Lander Counties, Nevada" Geological Survey Professional Paper 459-A (1964)
- Roberts, Ralph Jackson. "The genesis of disseminated and massive sulfide deposits in Saudi Arabia" USGS Open-File Report No. 76-602 (1976)
- Luce, Robert W., Bagdady, A., Roberts, R.J. "Geology and ore deposits of the Mahd adh Dhahab district, Kingdom of Saudi Arabia" USGS Open-File Report No. 76-865 (1976)
- Roberts, Ralph Jackson, Rye, R.O., Mawad, M.M. "Preliminary sulfur isotope investigations of mineral deposits in the Precambrian shield, Kingdom of Saudi Arabia" USGS Open-File Report No. 78-776 (1978)
- Roberts, Ralph Jackson, Bagdady, A., Luce, R.W. "Geochemical investigations in the Mahd Adh Dhahab District, Kingdom of Saudi Arabia" USGS Open-File Report No. 78-777 (1978)
- Bagdady, A.Y., Whitlow, J.W., Roberts, R.J. "Placer gold deposits in the Mahd Adh Dhahab district, Kingdom of Saudi Arabia" USGS Open-File Report No. 78-1074 (1978)
- Martin, Conrad, Roberts, R.J., Stoeser, D.B. "Titaniferous magnetite in the layered intrusive complex at Lakathah, Kingdom of Saudi Arabia" USGS Open-File Report No. 79-1210 (1979)
- Roberts, Ralph Jackson. "Iron sulfide deposits at Wadi Wassat, Kingdom of Saudi Arabia" USGS Open-File Report No. 82-176 (1981)

== Later life ==
In 2002, Roberts published his autobiography, entitled A Passion for Gold. ISBN 0-87417-502-X

== See also ==
- Carlin Trend
- John Livermore, co-discoverer of the Carlin Mine
- Gold mining in Nevada
