= Crary Mountains =

Volcanoes in Antarctica

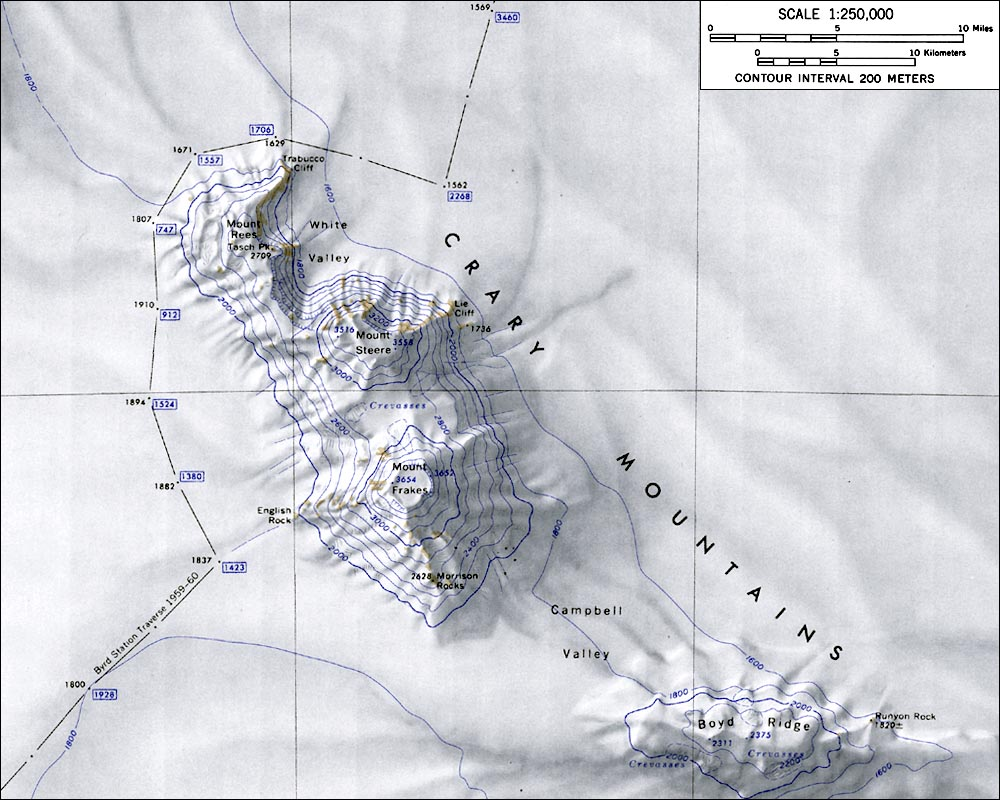
- Map of the Crary Mountains

Highest point
- Peak: Mount Frakes
- Elevation: 3,652 m (11,982 ft)
- Coordinates: 76°48′S 117°42′W

Geography
- Continent: Antarctica
- Region: Marie Byrd Land

Geology
- Formed by: Shield volcanoes
- Volcanic field: Marie Byrd Land Volcanic Province

Crary Mountains (76°48′S 117°40′W) are a group of ice-covered volcanoes in Marie Byrd Land, Antarctica. They consist of two or three shield volcanoes, named Mount Rees, Mount Steere and Mount Frakes, which developed during the course of the Miocene and Pliocene and last erupted about 30,000-40,000 years ago. The first two volcanoes are both heavily incised by cirques, while Mount Frakes is better preserved and has a 4 kilometres (2.5 mi) wide caldera at its summit. Boyd Ridge is another part of the mountain range and lies southeast of Mount Frakes; it might be the emergent part of a platform that underlies the mountain range.

The volcanoes consist mainly of basalt, trachyte and phonolite in the form of lava flows, scoria and hydrovolcanic formations. Volcanic activity here is linked to the West Antarctic Rift system, which is responsible for the formation of a number of volcanoes in the region. During their existence, the range was affected by glaciation and glacial-volcanic interactions.

== Geography and geomorphology ==
The mountain range lies in eastern Marie Byrd Land, Antarctica, about 250 kilometres (160 mi) from the Bakutis Coast. It was first visited in 1959–1960, and several accessible outcrops were sampled. The name refers to Albert P. Crary, who was then deputy chief scientist for the US-IGY Antarctic Program.

The Crary Mountains are a chain of three shield volcanoes 50 kilometres (31 mi) long which extends in northwest–southeast direction. The volume of the volcanoes exceeds 400 cubic kilometres (96 cu mi) and the edifices consist of lavas, hydrovolcanic deposits such as hyaloclastite, fragments of pillow lavas and tuffs, and scoria. Unlike many other mountains in Marie Byrd Land, which owing to a lack of erosion display only their highest and youngest parts, in the Crary Mountains the internal structure of the volcanoes are well exposed due to glacial erosion. The Crary Mountains form a drainage divide for the West Antarctic Ice Sheet; they dam it, which is thus higher on the southwestern side of the range. Debris stripes have been observed on the ice near the foot of the mountains.

The northeasternmost volcano is Mount Rees, which reaches a summit height of 2,709 metres (8,888 ft) at Tasch Peak. Volcanic rocks crop out at Trabucco Cliff on its northeastern flank. There is no caldera. Glacial erosion has cut deep cirques into the eastern flank of Mount Rees, and volcanic outcrops indicate that volcanic rocks alternate between subglacial formations and subaerial formations. Outcrops consist of breccia and lavas, which in one case are intruded by a dike.

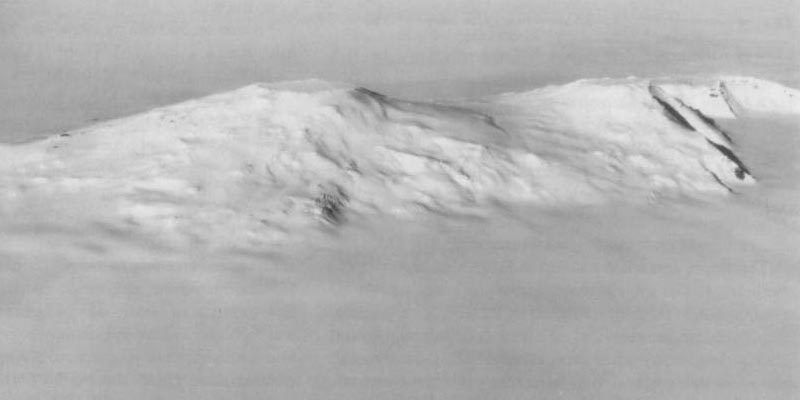
Mount Frakes and Mount Steere

In the middle of the chain lies Mount Steere with a summit elevation of 3,558 metres (11,673 ft) and a rectangular summit caldera. Lie Cliff is a volcanic outcrop on the northeastern flank. Mount Steere is heavily dissected, bears evidence of former glaciation in the form of moraines and cirques have been eroded into its northern and northeastern flanks. As with Mount Rees, volcanic rocks alternate between these that formed subglacially and these formed subaerially. Outcrops feature breccias and lava with numerous intruded dikes.

South of Mount Steere is Mount Frakes, with 3,654 metres (11,988 ft) it is the highest peak in the range and the least eroded of the Crary Mountains. It has a 4 kilometres (2.5 mi) wide circular summit caldera and unlike Mount Rees and Mount Steere it bears no evidence of subglacial eruptions, probably due to lack of erosion that could have exposed them. Volcanic rocks crop out both on the southern and western flank, at Morrison Rocks and English Rock respectively. These outcrops are cinder cones that formed on the slopes of Mount Frakes. Volcanic and nonvolcanic boulders on the slopes of Mount Frakes may either be xenoliths or glacial erratics.

Boyd Ridge is smaller than the other three volcanoes and located southeast of Mount Frakes and reaches an elevation of 2,375 metres (7,792 ft). Runyon Rock crops out to its east and is the only area of Boyd Ridge not covered by ice. Cinders and a cliff of hyaloclastite are found there.

The volcanoes rise from a platform formed by lava flows and pyroclastic rocks. This platform lies at about 2,700–2,800 metres (8,900–9,200 ft) elevation and the Boyd Ridge may be a southeastward extension thereof. It appears that the platform — which crops out only on the eastern side of the Crary Mountains — was tilted westward by faulting. Echo and magnetic sounding have imaged the root of the Crary Mountains in the West Antarctic Ice Sheet, finding that the underlying terrain is steep and flanked by narrow troughs. The mountains are associated with a strong magnetic anomaly that may reflect subglacial rocks containing magnetite.

== Geology ==
Cenozoic volcanism in Marie Byrd Land is related to the West Antarctic Rift and has been explained by the activity of a mantle plume. This plume either underlies Marie Byrd Land and its volcanoes, or it rose to the surface before Antarctica separated from New Zealand during the middle Cretaceous and induced volcanism across the continental borderlands of the Southwest Pacific. In the latter theory, the Marie Byrd Land volcanism is caused by a remnant plume head underneath the continent. The basement crops out along the coast and consists of granitoids and metamorphic sediments left by a Devonian-Cretaceous volcanic arc.

This volcanism manifests itself with 18 large and numerous smaller volcanoes, which occur in groups, rows or as solitary systems in Marie Byrd Land. The larger centres have produced phonolite, rhyolite, trachyte and rocks with intermediate compositions, and reach heights of over 3,000 metres (9,800 ft) above sea level. The smaller centres are found at the foot of the larger centres, as parasitic vents on their slopes or along the coast. These vents have produced alkali basalt, basanite and hawaiite.

=== Composition ===
Basalt occurs at all four volcanoes. Phonolite and trachyte are found at Mount Rees and Mount Steere, the former also at Mount Frakes; Mount Rees also features rhyolite. Phenocrysts include clinopyroxene, magnetite, olivine and plagioclase. The magma erupted in the Crary Mountains originated in the mantle and underwent fractional crystallization after formation.

=== Geologic history ===
The Crary Mountains were active between 9.3 and 0.04 million years ago during the Miocene and Pliocene. The youngest dates have been obtained by argon-argon dating on Mount Frakes, and imply an eruption 35,000±10,000–32,000±10,000 years ago. These ages were obtained on English Rock, which has also yielded ages of 826,000±79,000–851,000±36,000 and 1.62±0.02 million years ago. Tephra deposits in ice cores recovered at Byrd Station may have originated at Marie Byrd Land volcanoes such as these of the Crary Mountains.

The maximum age of each volcano decreases in southeastward direction, from 9.34±0.24 million years old Mount Rees to 2.67±0.39 million years old Boyd Ridge. The pattern of volcanism migrating along the chain has been observed at other mountain ranges such as the Executive Committee Range, where it takes place at a pace of 7 millimetres per year (0.28 in/year) like at the Crary Mountains. It is directed away from the centre of the Marie Byrd Land volcanic province and may reflect the propagation of a fracture in the crust. Present-day seismicity occurs 25 kilometres (16 mi) south of the Crary Mountains on a subglacial mountain, which may be part of the same trend.

West Antarctica has been subject to glaciation since the Oligocene, where a perhaps local ice cap or snow deposit existed at Mount Petras. Volcanoes erupting through ice leave specific geologic structures which can be used to reconstruct the timing and extent of past glaciations. Geologic evidence at the Crary Mountains implies that a substantial West Antarctic Ice Sheet existed during the Miocene, and that fluctuations in its size may have stressed the crust and modulated the activity of volcanoes in its area. Before its formation the Crary Mountains might have been islands. In the Crary Mountains, ice occurred either in the form of slope ice when the mountains were erupting or as a thick continental ice sheet. The glaciers were cold-based and thus did not produce tillites or glacial surfaces, and were probably thin. Glacial erosion took place mainly between 8.55 and 4.17 million years ago; it formed the cirques in Mount Rees and Mount Steere and transported glacial erratics on the mountains. Climate change may cause a notable thinning of the ice around the Crary Mountains.

== Named features ==
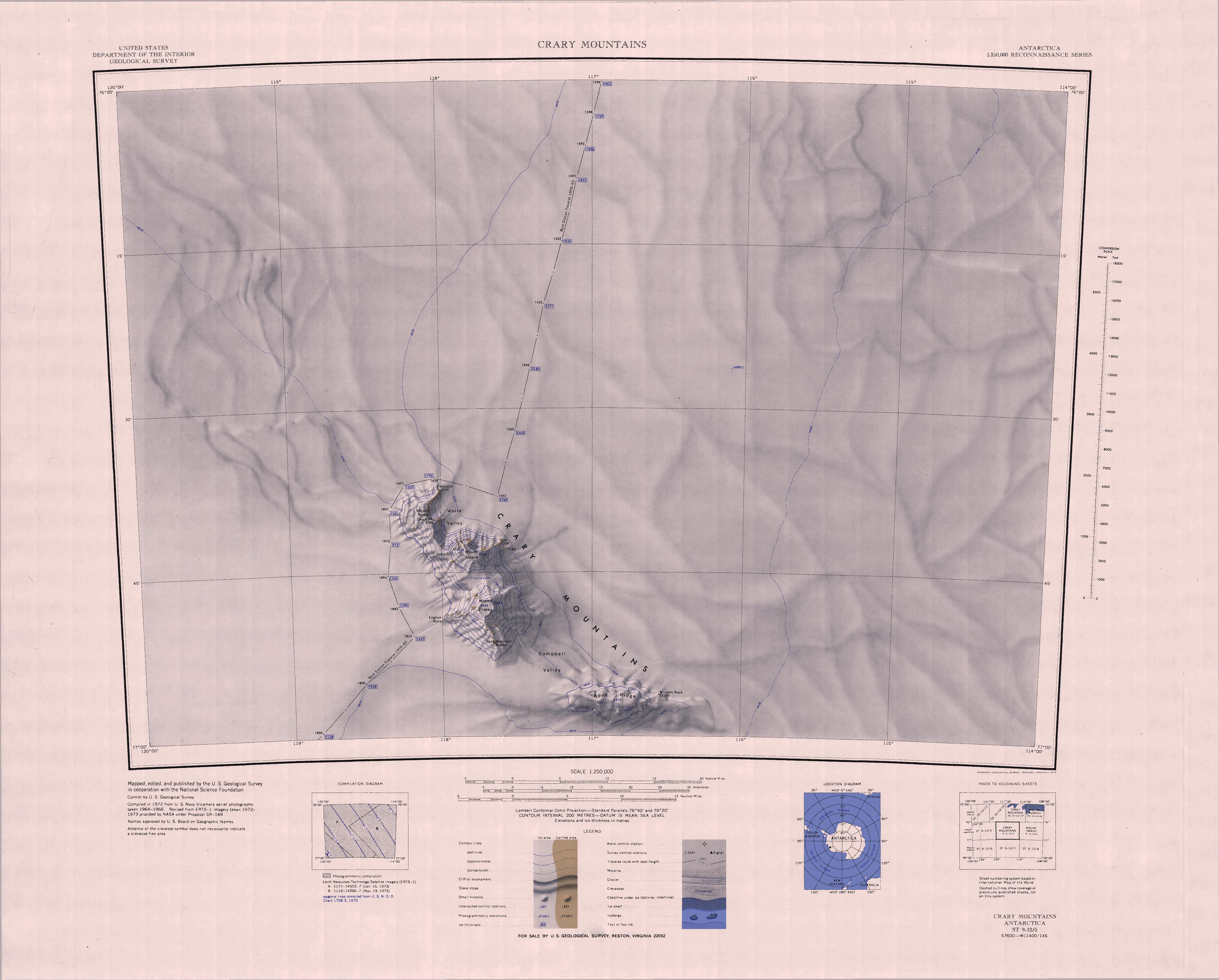
Crary Mountains in southwest of map

Named features, from northwest to southeast, include Trabucco Cliff, Mount Rees, Tasch Peak, White Valley, Mount Steere, Lie Cliff, Mount Frakes, English Rock, Morrison Rocks, Campbell Valley, Boyd Ridge and Runyon Rock. The features were all mapped by the United States Geological Survey (USGS) from surveys and United States Navy aerial photography in 1959–66.

=== Trabucco Cliff ===
76°37′S 118°01′W. A cliff at the tip of the broad spur which forms the northeast extremity of Mount Rees. Named by the United States Advisory Committee on Antarctic Names (US-ACAN) for William J. Trabucco, United States Antarctic Research Program (USARP) ionospheric physicist at McMurdo Station, 1969, and Siple Station, 1973.

=== Mount Rees ===
76°40′S 118°10′W. Mountain located 7 nautical miles (13 km; 8.1 mi) northwest of Mount Steere in the north end of Crary Mountains. Named by US-ACAN for Manfred H. Rees, aurora scientist at Byrd Station, 1965–66 season.

=== Tasch Peak ===
76°40′S 118°03′W. A rocky peak in the southeast portion of Mount Rees. Named by US-ACAN for Paul Tasch, USARP geologist in the Sentinel Range and Ohio Range, summer 1966–67, and Coalsack Bluff, 1969–70.

=== White Valley ===
76°39′S 117°57′W. A broad ice-covered valley that indents the northern part of Crary Mountains between Trabucco Cliff and Lie Cliff. Named by US-ACAN for Franklin E. White, USARP ionospheric physicist at Byrd Station in four summer seasons, 1966–71.

=== Mount Steere ===
76°44′S 117°49′W. Prominent mountain 3,500 metres (11,500 ft) high standing 4 nautical miles (7.4 km; 4.6 mi) north-northwest of Mount Frakes. Named by US-ACAN for William C. Steere, biologist at McMurdo Station, 1964–65 season.

=== Lie Cliff ===
76°42′S 117°37′W. A prominent rock cliff at the eastern foot of Mount Steere. Named by US-ACAN for Hans P. Lie, USARP ionospheric physicist at Siple Station in the 1970–71 and 1973-74 summer seasons.

=== Mount Frakes ===
76°48′S 117°42′W. A prominent mountain 3,675 metres (12,057 ft) high marking the highest elevation in the Crary Mountains. Named by US-AC AN for Lawrence A. Frakes, USARP geologist who worked three summer seasons in the Falkland Islands and Antarctica, 1964-65 through 1967–68.

=== English Rock ===
76°49′S 118°00′W. A rock outcrop near the foot of the western slope of Mount Frakes. Named by US-ACAN for Claude L. English Jr., United States Navy, helicopter crewman with Squadron VXE-6 during Deep Freeze 1970; he also deployed with the Squadron during Deep Freeze 1961, 1962 and 1965.

=== Morrison Rocks ===
76°51′S 117°39′W. A group of rocks which outcrop along the southern slope of Mount Frakes. Named by US-ACAN for Paul W. Morrison, United States Navy, hospital corpsman at the South Pole Station in 1974.

=== Campbell Valley ===
76°55′S 117°40′W. An ice-filled valley, or pass, extending east–west between the main group of peaks of the Crary Mountains and Boyd Ridge. Named by US-ACAN for Wallace H. Campbell, ionospheric physicist at McMurdo Station in the 1964–65 season; Macquarie Island, 1961–62.

=== Boyd Ridge ===
76°57′S 116°57′W. An ice-covered ridge, 22 nautical miles (41 km; 25 mi) long, which extends in an east–west direction and forms the south end of the Crary Mountains. It is separated from the main peaks of the group by Campbell Valley. Named by US-ACAN for John C. Boyd, USARP biologist at McMurdo Station, 1965–66 and 1966–67 seasons.

=== Runyon Rock ===
76°56′S 116°33′W. A prominent rock along the northern side of Boyd Ridge. Named by US-ACAN for William E. Runyon, United States Navy, construction electrician at the South Pole Station in 1969 and 1974.
