= Military Geology Unit =

- Active: 1942-1945
- Country: United States
- Branch: United States Geological Survey
- Role: Terrain Intelligence

The Military Geology Unit was a unit in the United States military during World War II. It was established on June 24, 1942, six months after Pearl Harbor. People in the US Geological Survey wanted to get involved in the war effort, either for patriotism or prestige or both, and provided a geological intelligence report for a randomly chosen country, Sierra Leone.

The Sierra Leone report described the terrain, locations of water supplies and road-building materials, and other facts useful for military operations. The US military bought the idea and so the Military Geological Unit was formed, starting out with six people but quickly expanding.

The USGS continued to operate a Military Geology Unit through 1975, providing the US Department of Defense with research and documentation necessary for military operations.

== Staff ==
The entire Military Geology Unit wartime roster was 88 geologists, 11 soil scientists, 6 bibliographers, 5 engineers, three editors, one forester and 43 assisting staff. Most of the reports prepared by the Unit were prepared by teams made up mainly of geologists but commonly included soils scientists, botanists, climatologists, and geographers. Nearly all of the soils scientists and climatologists were members of the US Department of Agriculture's Soil Conservation Service.

During World War II geology won its spurs as an important tool in both planning and operations in the US Army. This growth of geology was due to the increased appreciation on the part of our military leaders of the importance of scientific techniques and information, and to the increased appreciation on the part of our scientists of the usefulness of their abilities in the solution of a large variety of very practical problems.

== Research Conducted ==
=== Normandy Invasion ===
The geological conditions of the Normandy beaches for the Invasion of Normandy were investigated by the American and British MGU. Some of the civilian scientists were sent ashore months before the invasion. "...civilian scientists, not all of them young or signally muscled, landed on the beaches ... wriggling along on their bellies, within range of German guns, they obtained samples of sand soil so when the tanks and trucks bustled ashore the drivers would be prepared for the terrain the equipment would be on hand to bridge the worst spots."

Research in 17th and 18th century French geological reports showed the land had clay underneath the sand which would bog down tanks and other vehicles. To find out the truth, geologists went ashore before the invasions with boring tools to find out if the old reports were correct, and special equipment was developed to overcome the problem.

For the invasion, large scale maps, in three editions, of the Normandy beach conditions of 1:5,000 were printed in great secrecy, with each map numbered for controlled use. Few copies of these maps survived the war. Other maps were prepared to show the best areas suitable for building airfields, and of water supply locations.

=== Origin of Balloon Bombs ===
The Military Geology Unit was key in determining the origin of Japanese Fu-Go balloon bombs. Working with Colonel Sidman Poole of US Army Intelligence, the researchers of the Military Geological Unit began microscopic and chemical examination of the sand from the sandbags to determine types and distribution of diatoms and other microscopic sea creatures, and its mineral composition. The sand could not be coming from American beaches, nor from the mid-Pacific. It had to be coming from Japan. Ultimately the geologists determined the precise beaches in Japan the sand had been taken from. By this time, it was mostly irrelevant, since by early spring the balloon offensive was almost over.

=== Planetary Geology ===
A number of reports were produced by the Military Geologists covering the moon, including the first photogeologic map of the near side.

=== Permafrost ===
Under the aegis of the Military Geology Unit, some of the earliest research and documentation on permafrost was published in English. Research on the topic had only been previously published in Russian.

== Bibliography ==
- Bevan, Arthur. 1944. "Military Geology." Scientific Monthly. Volume 62, 1946. Pages 466-468.
- Bonham, Selma and Leith, William (William Stanley), 1997, Reports and maps of the Military Geology Unit, 1942-1975. Reston, Va.: U.S. Geological Survey. 116 leaves. U.S. Geological Survey open-file report; 97-175.
- Geological Survey (U.S.). Military Geology Branch. 1945?, The Military Geology Unit: U. S. Geological Survey and Corps of Engineers, U. S. Army. "Prepared by members of the staff of the Military Geology Unit for distribution at the Pittsburgh (1945) meeting of The Geological Society of America." No place of publication given: The Geological Society of America. 22 pages.
- Hadden, Robert Lee. 2003. "The Heringen Collection of the US Geological Survey Library." Session No. 94, History of Geology (GSA History of Geology Division, History of Earth Science Society [HESS]). November 3, 2003. Geological Society of America Abstracts with Programs, Vol. 35, No. 6, September 2003, p. 252.
- Hadden, Robert Lee. 2008. "The Heringen Collection of the US Geological Survey Library, Reston, VA." Published in Earth Science History, v27 n2 p242-265, 2008. ISSN 0736-623X.
- Hunt, C.B. 1950. "Military Geology Unit" IN: Application of Geology to Engineering Practice. The Geological Society of America. The Charles Peter Berkey Volume. November 1950. Pages 305-325.
- Kaye, C.A. 1957. "Military Geology in the United States Sector of the European Theater of Operations During World War II." Geological Society of America Bulletin. Volume 68, pages 47–54.
- Kiersch, George A., 1998, "Engineering geosciences and military operation." Engineering Geology. 49; 2, Pages 123-176.
- Leith, William and John R. Matzko. 1998. "Recent Activities in Military Geology at the U.S. Geological Survey," In: Military Geology in War and Peace, 1998. Reviews in Engineering Geology, Volume 13. pages 49–55.
- Leith, William, ed. 1997. "Reports and Maps of the Military Geology Unit, 1942-1975." US Geological Survey Open-File Report 97-175. Compiled by Selma Bonham, 1981.
- C. M. Nelson and E. P. F. Rose. "The U. S. Geological Survey's Military Geology Unit in World War II; the Army's pet prophets." Quarterly Journal of Engineering Geology and Hydrogeology (August 2012), 45(3):349-367.
- Pangborn, Mark W. 1945. "Military Geology and the Library." Library Journal. Volume LXX, November 15, 1945, pages 1056-1057.
- Rose, Edward P.F. 2005. "Military Geology." In: Selley, Richard C. et al., eds. Encyclopedia of Geology. Elsevier. Volume III, pages 474-487.
- Simon, L.J. 1957. Additional Notes on the Use of Geologists in the European Theater of Operations During World War II." Bulletin of the Geological Society of America. Volume 68, pages 1567-1568.
- Snyder, C.T. 1957. The Importance of Geology in Planning the Normandy Invasion." Geological Society of America Bulletin. Volume 68, page 1565-1566.
- Sommers, Martin. 1945. "The Army's Pet Prophets." Saturday Evening Post. March 24, 1945. Volume 217, number 39, pages 18–19, 97-98.
- Terman, Maurice J, 1998, "Military Geology Unit of the U. S. Geological Survey during World War II." In: Military Geology in War and Peace. Reviews in Engineering Geology, Volume 13. pages 49–55.
- Whitmore, Frank C. 1954. "Military Geology." The Military Engineer. Volume XLVI, number 311, pages 212-215.
