= Whitney Peak =

Whitney Peak may refer to:

- Whitney Peak (Antarctica), a peak in Marie Byrd Land, Antarctica
- Whitney Peak (actress), Ugandan actress
