= Mount Waesche =

Volcano in Antarctica

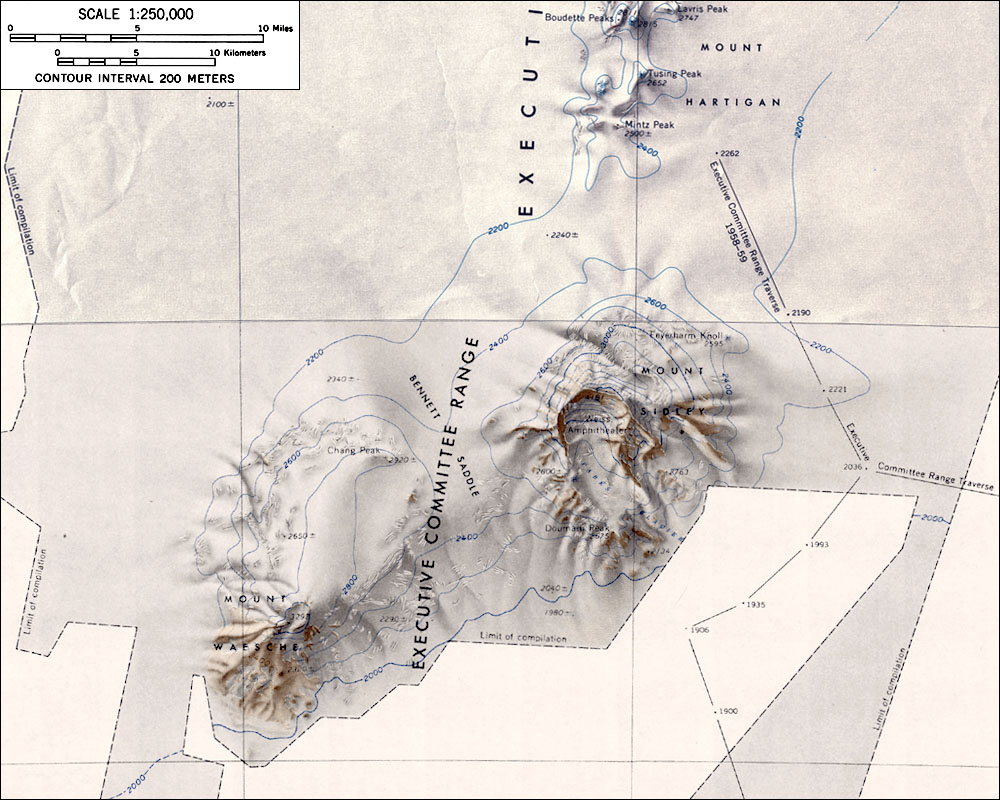
- Topographic map of Mounts Sidley and Waesche

Highest point
- Elevation: 3,292 m (10,801 ft)
- Coordinates: 77°10′S 127°00′W

Geography
- Location within Antarctica
- Location: Marie Byrd Land, Antarctica
- Parent range: Executive Committee Range

Geology
- Mountain type: Shield volcano
- Volcanic field: Marie Byrd Land Volcanic Province
- Last eruption: Unknown

Mount Waesche is a mountain of volcanic origin at the southern end of the Executive Committee Range in Marie Byrd Land, Antarctica. It is 3,292 metres (10,801 feet) high, and stands 20 kilometres (12 miles) southwest of Mount Sidley, the highest volcano in Antarctica. The mountain lies southwest of the Chang Peak caldera and is largely covered with snow and glaciers, but there are rock exposures on the southern and southwestern slopes.

The volcano may have been active as late as the Holocene, with tephra layers recovered from ice cores possibly originating from Mount Waesche. Seismic activity has been recorded both from the volcano and from an area south of it and might reflect ongoing volcanic activity.

== Name and research history ==
It was discovered by the United States Antarctic Service expedition on a flight on December 15, 1940, and named for Vice Admiral Russell R. Waesche, United States Coast Guard, member of the Antarctic Service Executive Committee. Field studies took place in 1999-2000 and 2018–2019.

== Geography and geomorphology ==
Mount Waesche lies in Marie Byrd Land, one of the most inaccessible areas of Antarctica. It is one of 18 volcanoes in that region, which were active from the Oligocene to recent times. The origin of volcanic activity there has been correlated to the activity of a mantle plume underneath the crust. The region also includes the highest volcano in Antarctica, Mount Sidley, which reaches 4,191 metres (13,750 ft) height. There may be as many as 138 volcanoes buried underneath the ice.

Mount Waesche volcano is 3,292 metres (10,801 ft) high. It is a double volcano, with the north-northeasterly Chang Peak caldera and the south-southwesterly Mount Waesche proper. The Chang Peak caldera is 10 by 6 kilometres (6.2 mi × 3.7 mi) wide and the largest in Marie Byrd Land; Mount Waesche rises almost 500 metres (1,600 ft) over and lies on the rim of the caldera. Mount Waesche is the more conspicuous peak and lava flows crop out on its southern and southwestern flank, while a 2 kilometres (1.2 mi) wide caldera lies at its summit. On the northern side of Chang Peak caldera lies a 2,920 metres (9,580 ft) high outcrop, and it and another outcrop consist of pumice and vitrophyre. Both volcanoes appear to be mainly formed by lava. At least five parasitic vents lie on the volcano, with several aligned on radial fissure vents; they are cinder cones and scoria cones and have erupted cinder, lava and volcanic bombs. A 0.5 metres (1 ft 8 in) long large radial dyke projects from Mount Waesche and is the only part of the edifice where hyaloclastic tuff crops out. The Bennet Saddle separates Mount Waesche from Mount Sidley 20 kilometres (12 mi) to the northeast.

Mount Waesche is largely covered with snow and features several alpine glaciers as well as a blue-ice area (Note: Tephra is found in layers within the blue-ice area south of the volcano, one of these corresponds to the 8,200 BP eruption of Mount Takahe and some tephras have been attributed to Mount Berlin, about 300 kilometres (190 mi) away from Mount Waesche. Volcanic bombs attributed to Mount Waesche are also found.) within the West Antarctic Ice Sheet; this blue-ice area has an extent of 8 by 10 kilometres (5.0 mi × 6.2 mi) and a number of tephra layers crop out from the ice. Most of these tephra layers come from Mount Waesche, but some originate at Mount Takahe and Mount Berlin and their age ranges from 118,000 years to Holocene. Two particularly conspicuous tephra layers from Mount Waesche are known as the "Great Wall" and "Yellow Wall".

The volcano emerges through and is surrounded by the West Antarctic Ice Sheet. The ice sheet reaches an elevation of about 2,000 metres (6,600 ft) above sea level at Mount Waesche and flows southward towards the Ross Ice Shelf. Blue ice is found in some areas. Glacial activity has altered the volcano, generating glacial striae and roches moutonnees on the older volcanic rocks and frost shattering landforms and solifluction ridges. Glacial drift lies on the ice-free southwestern flank. In turn, glacial moraines have been overrun by lava flows. Two sets of moraines formed by volcanic debris – one containing ice, the other without – lie on the southern and southwestern flank, reaching heights of 120 metres (390 ft) and lengths of about 3 kilometres (1.9 mi). Surface exposure dating has indicated that they belong to an ice highstand that occurred about 10,000 years ago and that the volcanic rocks were probably extracted from underneath the ice. However, large parts of the volcano are exposed on its southwestern flank and apart from glacial erosion aeolian erosion has taken place on the volcano.

== Geology ==
Mount Waesche is part of the Executive Committee Range, which from north to south includes Mount Hampton, Mount Cumming with the parasitic vent Annexstad Peak, Mount Hartigan, Mount Sidley with Doumani Peak and Chang Peak-Mount Waesche. These mountains are all volcanic and feature ice-filled calderas, and many are paired volcanoes. Volcanic activity appears to be moving southward at a rate of 0.7 centimetres per year (0.28 in/year). Seismic activity recorded in 2010 and 2011 south of Mount Waesche may indicate ongoing magmatic activity south of the youngest volcano. Chang Peak and Mount Waesche appear to be located outside of the Executive Committee Range volcanic lineament.

The volcano erupted comendite, hawaiite and mugearite, with the former found at Chang Peak and the latter two at Mount Waesche proper; the parasitic cones have erupted a mugearite-benmoreite succession. The occurrence of rhyolite has also been reported. There appear to be two groups of volcanic rocks at Mount Waesche. Phenocrysts at Chang Peak include aenigmatite, alkali feldspar, ilmenite and quartz and at Mount Waesche olivine, plagioclase and titanaugite. Granulite and pyroxenite xenoliths have also been found. Despite their proximity, Mount Sidley and Mount Waesche have erupted distinctly different rocks. Unusually for volcanoes in Marie Byrd Land, the chemistry of volcanic rocks at Mount Waesche appears to have changed over time. The total volume of rocks is about 160 cubic kilometres (38 cu mi).

== Eruption history ==
The development of Mount Waesche began in the Pliocene, and Plio-Pleistocene tephra layers found in the Southern Pacific Ocean may originate at Mount Waesche. It appears that volcanism in the Executive Committee Range moved southwards over time, beginning at Mount Hampton and eventually arriving at Mount Waesche which is the young volcanic centre of the range. Chang Peak grew first, 1.6 million years ago or between 2.0–1.1 million years ago, while Mount Waesche formed within or about 1 million years ago; the youngest rocks at Waesche are less than 100,000 years old whereas there is no evidence of recent activity at Chang Peak. Argon-argon dating on rocks that today form moraines has yielded ages of about 200,000 years to over 500,000 years. One flank vent has been dated to be 170,000 years old and some rocks are too young to be dated by potassium-argon dating. A major pulse of lava flow emissions appears to have occurred 200,000-100,000 years ago and an older episode 500,000-300,000 years ago.

The volcano was active during the Holocene and may be a source of tephra found in ice cores. A layer of volcanic ash, about 8,000 years old, that was identified in the region through radar data probably originated at Mount Waesche. The volcano today is considered to be "probably active" or "possibly active". A magmatic system may exist 55 kilometres (34 mi) south of Mount Waesche at 25–40 kilometres (16–25 mi) depth below the ice. Present-day seismic activity has been recorded at Mount Waesche, but it might be either volcanic/tectonic or caused by ice movement. Future eruptions are unlikely to have any impact beyond the surroundings of the volcano.

== See also ==
- List of volcanoes in Antarctica

== Bibliography ==
- U.S. Geological Survey Geographic Names Information System: Mount Waesche
- "Skiing the Pacific Ring of Fire and Beyond". Amar Andalkar's Ski Mountaineering and Climbing Site. 2007 [1997].
