= Volcanic Seven Summits =

Highest volcanoes of the seven continents

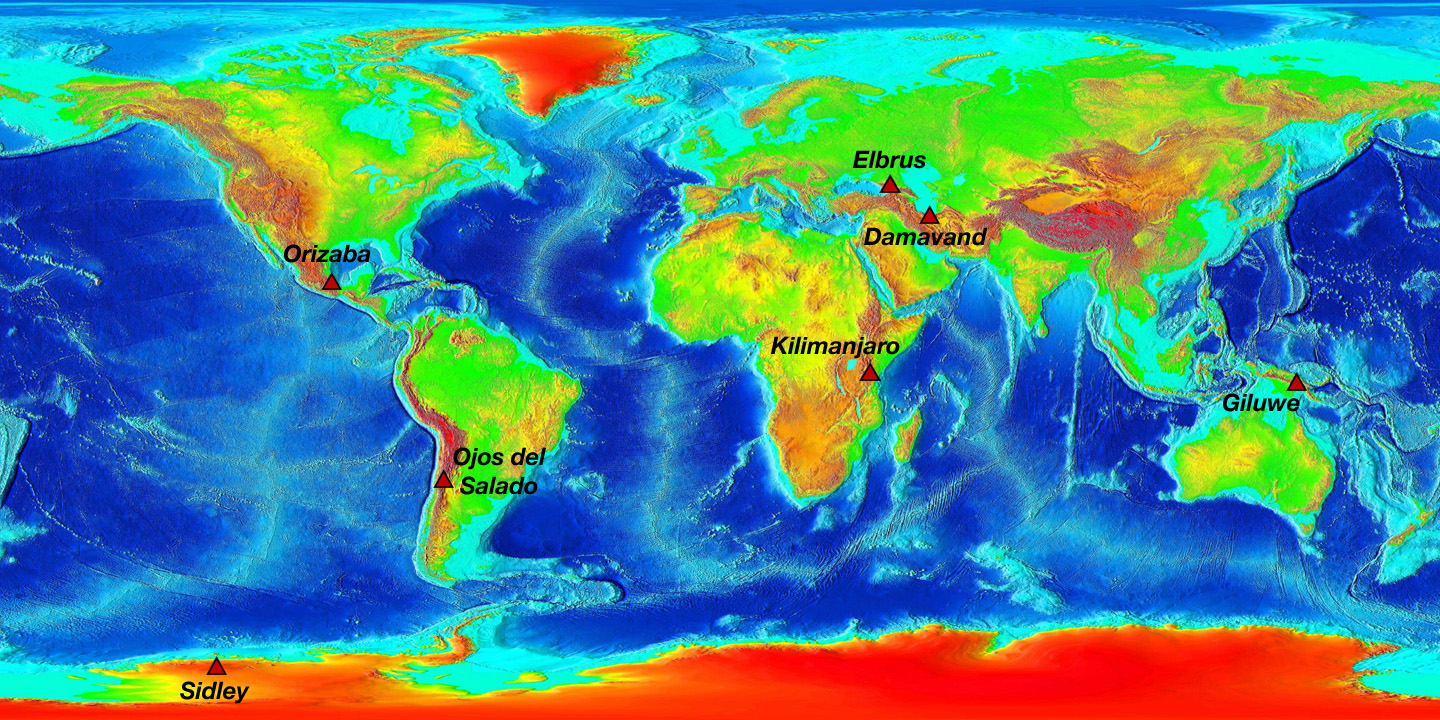
The Volcanic Seven Summits on an Elevation World Map. (Messner List)

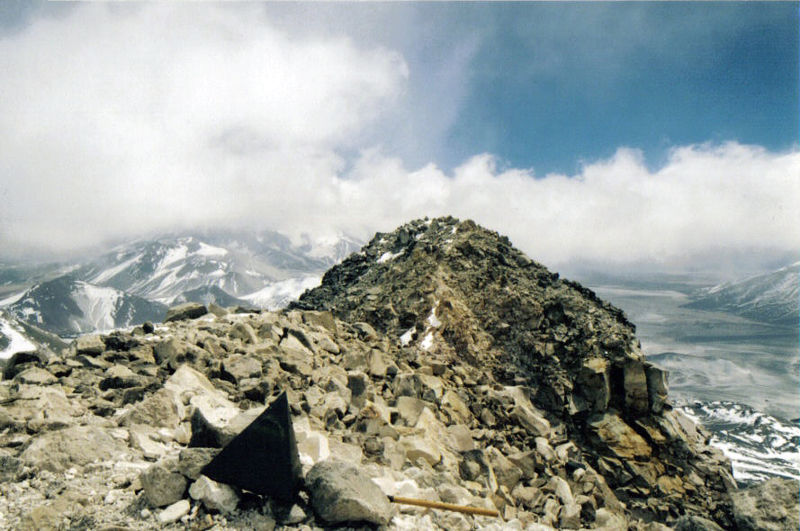
Summit of Ojos del Salado

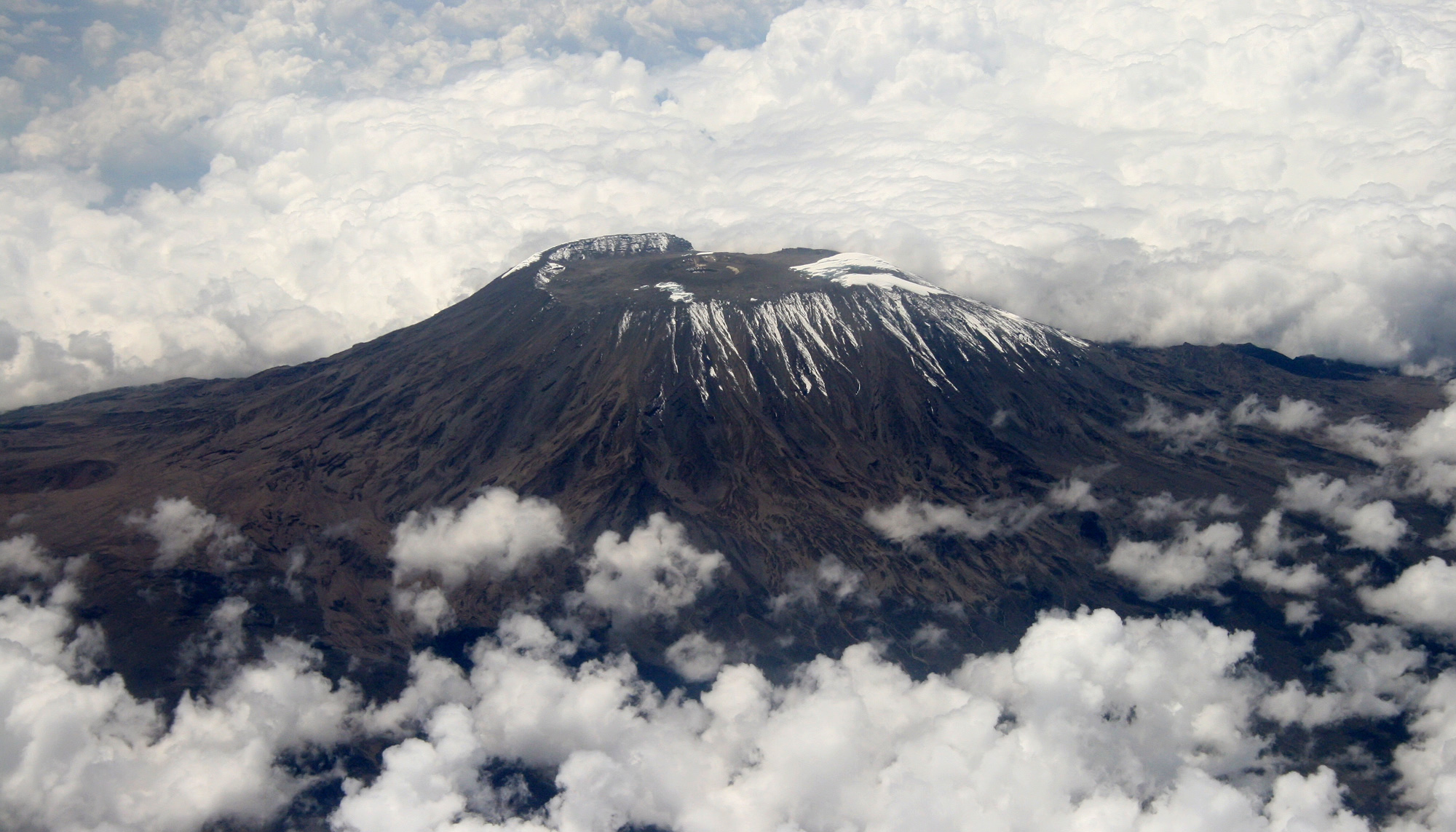
Kibo Summit of Kilimanjaro

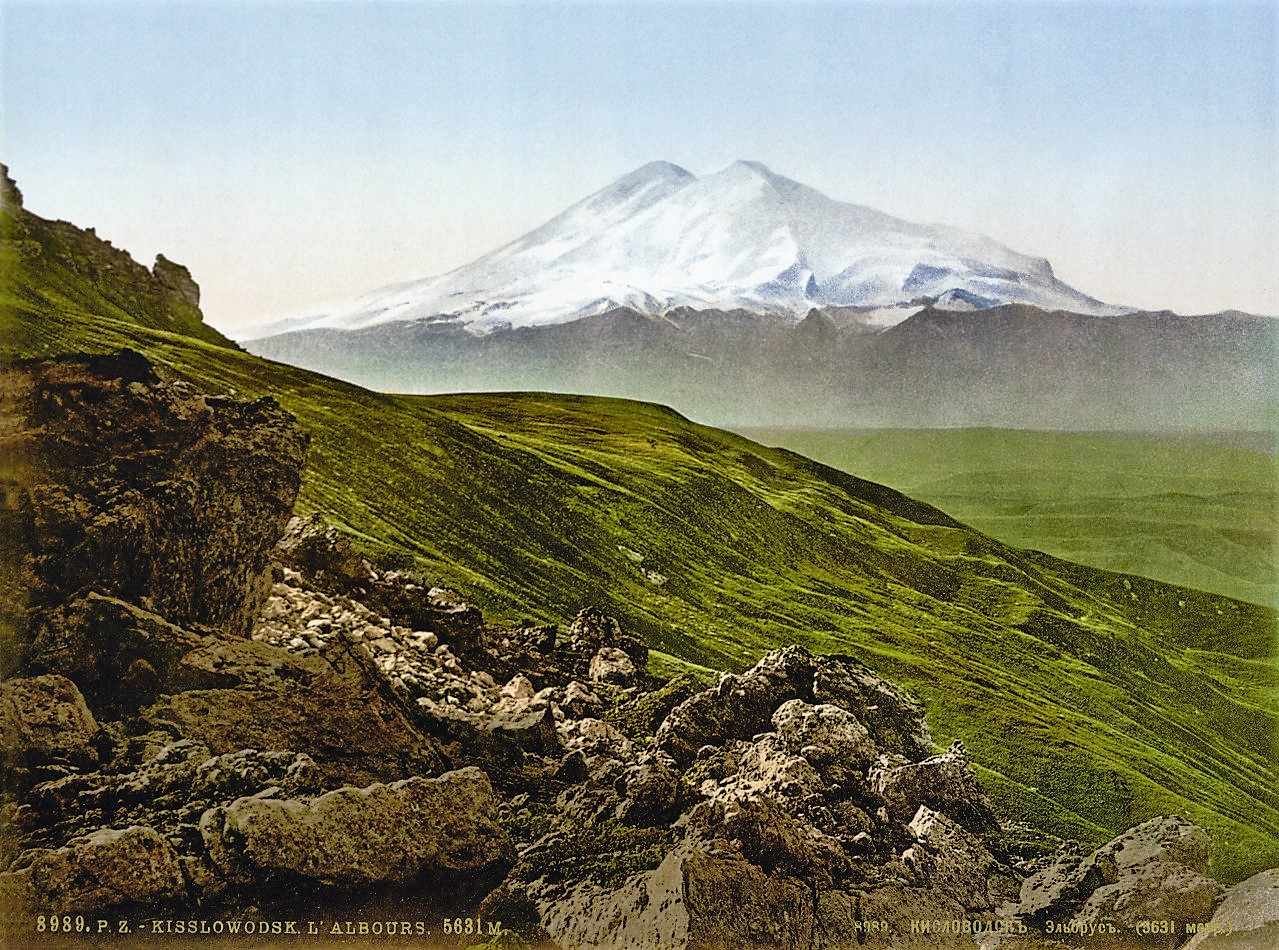
Mount Elbrus

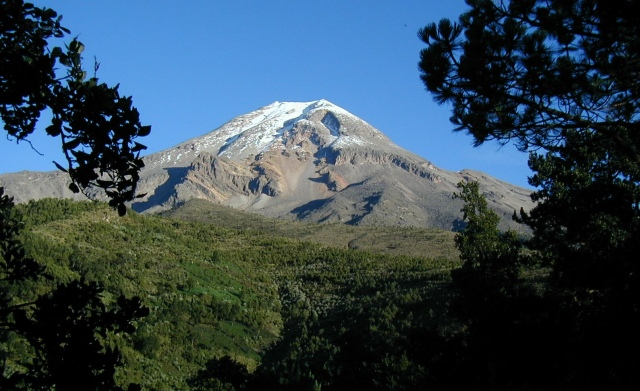
Pico de Orizaba

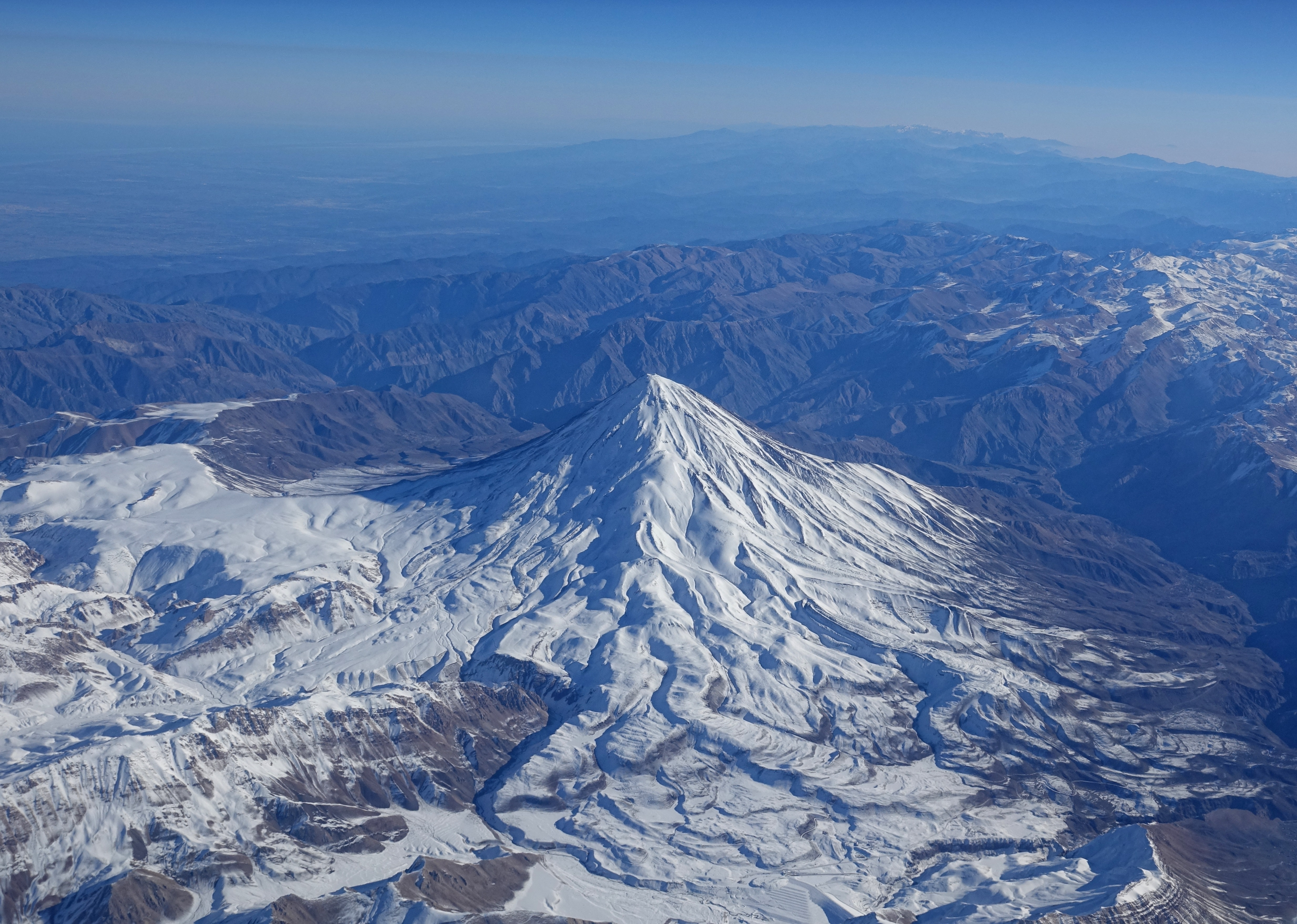
Mount Damavand

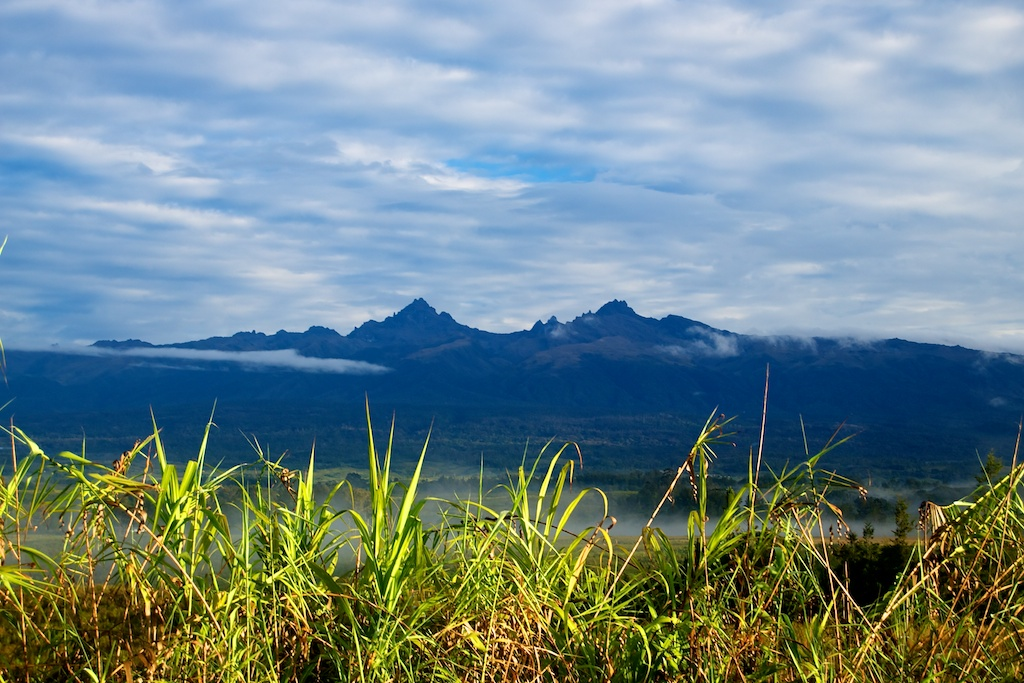
Mount Giluwe

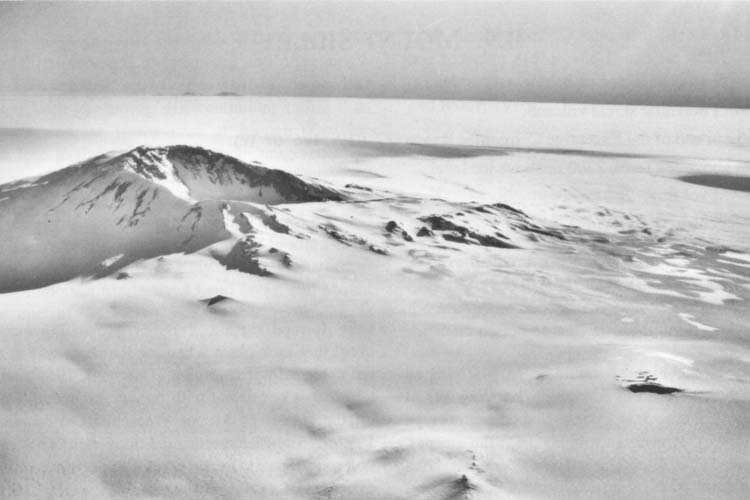
Mount Sidley

The Volcanic Seven Summits are the highest volcanoes on each of the seven continents, just as the Seven Summits are the highest peaks on each of the seven continents. Two of the Volcanic Seven Summits are also on the Seven Summits list. Kilimanjaro and Mount Elbrus, which were formed volcanically, are the highest peaks of their respective continents.

== Definitions and Disputes ==
Due to different interpretations of continental borders (geological, geographical, geopolitical), several definitions for the highest summits per continent and the number of continents are possible. The number of seven continents used here is based on the continent model used in Western Europe and the United States.

An additional complication in determining the highest volcanic summits is defining exactly what constitutes a volcano and how much topographic prominence it must have relative to any nearby non-volcanic peaks in order to qualify. For the purposes of this list, the summits must be an actual eruptive volcanic center, not merely made of volcanic rocks which were uplifted by other geological processes. In addition, a topographic prominence of at least 1,000 feet (300 m) is required, so that the list includes only genuine volcanic mountains and not minor outpourings of lava which happened to leak to the Earth's surface in high-altitude regions (see Asia below).

=== Africa, North America, Antarctica ===
No serious dispute exists as to the highest volcanoes in Africa, North America, and Antarctica—respectively, Kilimanjaro, Pico de Orizaba, and Mount Sidley.

=== Australia/Oceania ===
Although there are a few minor and inactive volcanoes on the Australian mainland, this list recognizes that the island of New Guinea is part of the Australian continent. Numerous scientific papers written in the 1970s and 1980s confirm that Mount Giluwe in Papua New Guinea is in fact an old eroded volcano, unlike the higher mountains of New Guinea which are all non-volcanic in origin.

If only mainland Australia is considered the continent, then Brumlow Top is the highest mountain in Australia. (Bass list)

=== Europe ===
The generally accepted geographical border between Europe and Asia runs along the crest of the Ural Mountains in central Russia and of the Caucasus along the southern border of Russia. Since the massive twin-peaked stratovolcano of Mount Elbrus rises just north of the crest, it is the highest summit in Europe and also the highest volcano.

Some geologists, though, consider the Kuma-Manych depression as the geological border between Asia and Europe. Such definition would render Elbrus entirely in Asia, making it the highest volcano of that continent (see below) and making Mount Etna (a 3400-meter active stratovolcano in Sicily, Italy) the highest volcano in Europe. Mount Teide in the Canary Islands, while active, taller than Etna and within the territory of a European country, would not be considered because geologically the Canaries belong to the African continent.

=== South America ===
Although Aconcagua, the highest peak in South America and the highest peak in the western hemisphere, does have a volcanic origin, its current high point is due to geological processes rather than being strictly volcanic. Due to this, Aconcagua is not considered to be a volcano on its own, at least not as a member of Volcanic Seven Summits.

Topographic maps of the Argentina and Chile border region which contains the highest peaks suffer from poor accuracy, with elevation errors exceeding 100 metres (330 ft) in many cases. However, the current consensus based on the most recent measurements places Ojos del Salado as the 2nd highest peak and highest volcano in South America, significantly higher than Monte Pissis.

=== Asia ===
The 5,610 m (18,406 ft) Mount Damavand is a very large isolated stratovolcano with over 4,600 m (15,000 ft) of topographic prominence.

There are more than 70 volcanic vents known as the Kunlun Volcanic Group in Tibet at higher elevations than Damavand's summit, the highest of which has a reported elevation of 5,808 m (19,055 ft) (35.5°N 80.2°E). Peaks in this volcanic group are not considered volcanic mountains but instead a type of pyroclastic cone. Information about these cones is extremely scarce and the listed elevations and prominences is of unknown accuracy and reliability. It is disputed whether any of these cones have a prominence greater than 300 m (1,000 ft). The volcanoes in the list below all have prominences far exceeding that threshold.

== List ==
The Volcanic Seven Summits list follows the Seven Summits list created by Richard Bass, who chose the highest mountain of mainland Australia, Mount Kosciuszko (2,228 m (7,310 ft)), to represent the Australian continent's highest summit. Reinhold Messner proposed another list (the Messner or Carstensz list) replacing Mount Kosciuszko with Western New Guinea's Puncak Jaya (4,884 m (16,024 ft)), which is part of Indonesia.

Following the Bass list, Brumlow Top (1,586 m (5,203 ft)) is the highest volcano in Australia. According to the Messner list, Mount Giluwe (4,368 m (14,331 ft)) on New Guinea is the highest volcano of the Australian continent.

Both lists consider the Caucasus Mountains as European. This makes Mount Elbrus (5,864 m (19,239 ft)), located in Russia, the highest volcano in Europe. Those who exclude the Caucasus Mountains from Europe, regard Mount Etna (3,403 m (11,165 ft)), located in Sicily, as Europe's highest volcano.

Volcanic Seven Summits (sorted by elevation)
Volcano	Bass list	Messner list	Elevation	Prominence	Continent	Range	Country	Coordinates
Ojos del Salado^{[*]}	✔	✔	6,893 m (22,615 ft)	3,688 m (12,100 ft)	South America	Andes	Argentina; Chile	27°06′35″S 68°32′29″W
Kilimanjaro^{[*]}	✔	✔	5,895 m (19,341 ft)	5,885 m (19,308 ft)	Africa	-	Tanzania	3°04′00″S 37°21′33″E
Elbrus^{[*]}	✔	✔	5,642 m (18,510 ft)	4,741 m (15,554 ft)	Europe	Caucasus	Russia	43°21′09″N 42°26′16″E
Pico de Orizaba^{[*]}	✔	✔	5,636 m (18,491 ft)	4,922 m (16,148 ft)	North America	Trans-Mexican Volcanic Belt	Mexico	19°02′N 97°16′W
Damavand	✔	✔	5,610 m (18,406 ft)	4,667 m (15,312 ft)	Asia	Alborz	Iran	35°57′19″N 52°06′33″E
Mount Sidley	✔	✔	4,285 m (14,058 ft)	2,517 m (8,258 ft)	Antarctica	Executive Committee Range	Antarctica	77°02′S 126°06′W
Mount Giluwe		✔	4,368 m (14,331 ft)	2,488 m (8,163 ft)	Oceania (continent)	New Guinea Highlands	Papua New Guinea	6°02′20″S 143°53′10″E
Brumlow Top	✔		1,586 m (5,203 ft)	1,118 m (3,668 ft)	Australia (mainland)	Barrington Tops	Australia	32°00′12″S 151°26′53″E

^{*} Note: Two of the Volcanic Seven Summits, Kilimanjaro and Elbrus, are also members of the Seven Summits. Ojos del Salado is a member of the Seven Second Summits, and Pico de Orizaba is a member of the Seven Third Summits.

== Climbing ==
In 2011, Mario Trimeri became the first person to summit all 12 (Kilimanjaro and Mount Elbrus are on both lists) of the Volcanic Seven Summits and the Seven Summits. Kuwaiti climber Yousef Al Refaie made a Guinness World Record and became youngest climber in the world and the first Middle Eastern Arab to complete the Seven Volcanic Summits at the age of 24 years 119 days when he scaled Mount Sidley (4,285 metres (14,058 ft)) in Antarctica on 22 December 2021, surpassing Indian mountaineer Satyarup Siddhanta who had previously made this record at the age of 35 years 261 days. On 9 December 2018 after scaling Ojos del Salado, Canadian climber Theodore Fairhurst became the oldest in the world to climb both the Seven Summits and Volcanic Seven Summits at 71 years and 231 days. On 4 July 2023, Australian-born Caroline Leon completed the Volcanic Seven Summits in the fastest time of 183 days.

== See also ==
- Explorers Grand Slam, also known as the Adventurer's Grand Slam
- Seven Summits
- Seven Second Summits
- Seven Third Summits
- Three Poles Challenge
- Eight-thousanders
