= Caroline Leon =

Australian climber

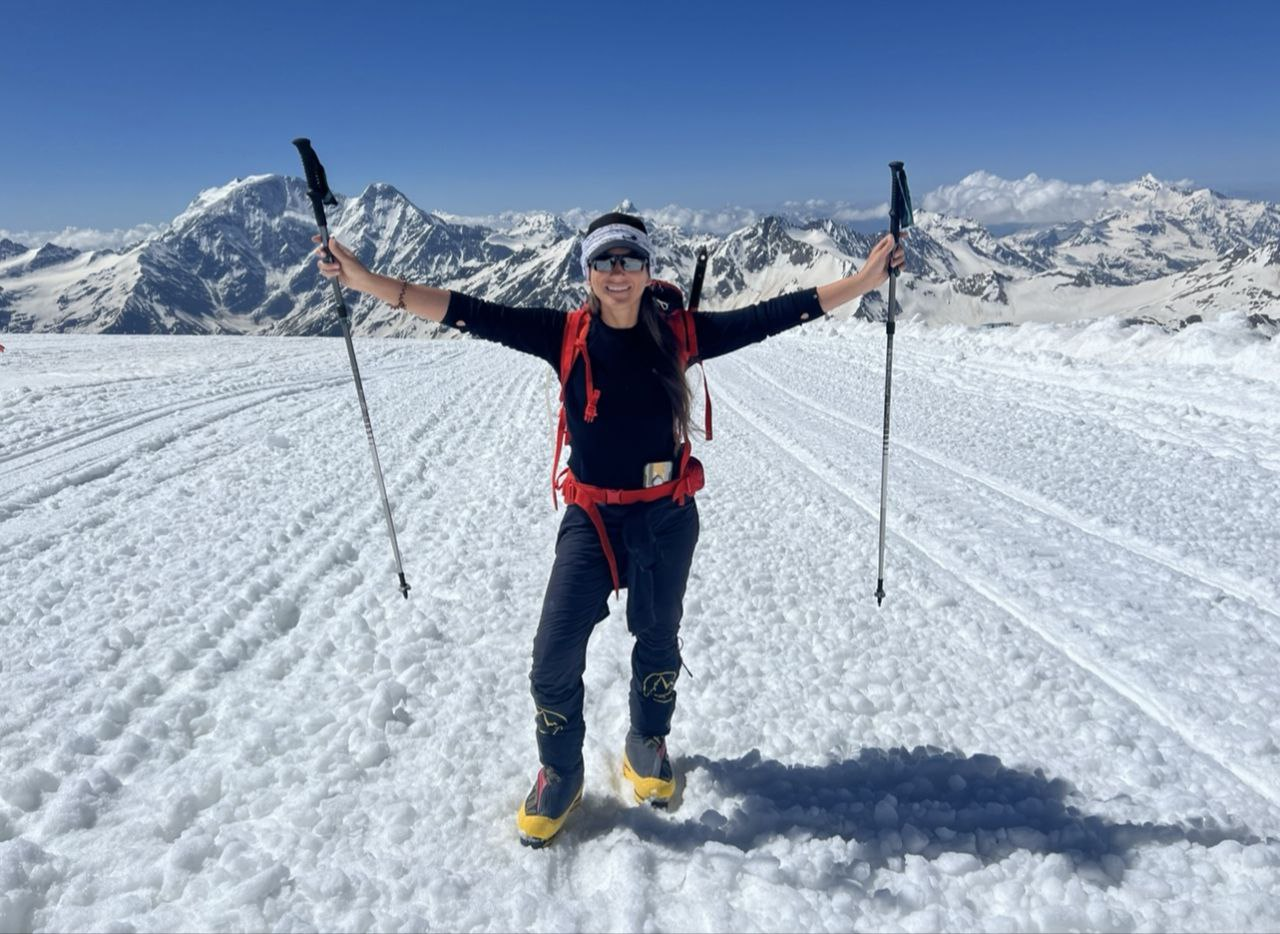
- Born: Sydney, Australia
- Education: B.Sc., Medical Science; Masters, Transpersonal Psychology
- Occupation: Climber
- Known for: Guinness World Record by becoming the fastest person in the world to summit the Volcanic Seven Summits.

Caroline Leon is an Australian climber who in 2023, set a Guinness World Record by becoming the first woman in the world to summit the Volcanic Seven Summits in fastest time.

Caroline set out to climb the highest volcanoes in each of the seven continents on 1 January 2023 by summiting the highest Volcano in the world; Ojos Del Salado 6,893 meters (22,615 ft.) in Chile, followed by Mt Sidley 4,285 meters (14,058 ft.) the highest Volcano in Antarctica, then Pico De Orizaba 5,636 meters (18,491 ft.) in Mexico. Caroline reached the seventh summit, Mt Damavand, the highest Volcano in Asia on 4 July 2023, completing the Volcanic Seven Summits in the fastest time of 183 days.

== Biography ==
In 2015, Carolin had a life threatening rock-climbing accident, when she fell 7–12 meters from an outdoor rock-climbing wall in Dubai. Caroline was rushed to hospital with life-threatening injuries that included two shattered feet, a broken pelvis and spine. Initially Doctors told her that she would never walk again. After 14 surgeries, 23 blood transfusions & two years of extensive rehabilitation Caroline regained the ability to walk.

In 2019, Caroline Leon became a DHL ambassador partnering with the logistics giant to set a New Guinness World Record to be the First woman in the world to summit all the mountains in the Middle East & the Arabian peninsula.

== Climbing career ==
Caroline started mountain climbing in 2012 when she climbed Kilimanjaro for the Gulf Charity; Gulf for Good. Since then Caroline has climbed over 38 mountains including climbing Mt Kilimanjaro 4 times, and Mount Damavand 3 times.

Caroline attempted a New Guinness World Record to be the First woman in the world to summit all the mountains in the Middle East & the Arabian peninsula in less than 30 days. As part of this initiative Caroline climbed several mountains in the Middle East; (2019) - Jebel Shams, Oman, (2019) Jebel Sawda, Saudi Arabia, (2019) Mt St Catherine, Egypt, (2019) Mt Ararat, Turkey, (2019) Mt Hermon, Syria, (2019) Jebal el Sheikh, Lebanon, (2019) Mt Damavand, Iran (2019) Jabal Dami, Jordan, (2019) Jebel Jais, UAE.

In 2023, Caroline completed a speed record of the Volcanic Seven Summits climbing; (2023).

Caroline has also climbed (2018) - Mt Longonot, Kenya, (2019) - Mt Kosciuszko, Australia, (2021) - Mt Baker, USA, (2022) - Mt Meru, Tanzania, (2022) - Mt Kazbek, Georgia, (2022) - San Francisco, Chile, (2022) - Siete Hermanos, Chile, (2023) - La Maliche, Mexico, (2024) - Aconcagua, Argentina, (2023) - Manso, Argentina, (2023) - Mt Bonete, Argentina, (2024) - Mera Peak, Nepal, (2024) - Lobuche East Nepal, (2024) Island Peak, Nepal.

Caroline reached the summit of Mount Everest on 23 May 2025.
