= Mount Giluwe =

Eroded shield volcano in Papua New Guinea

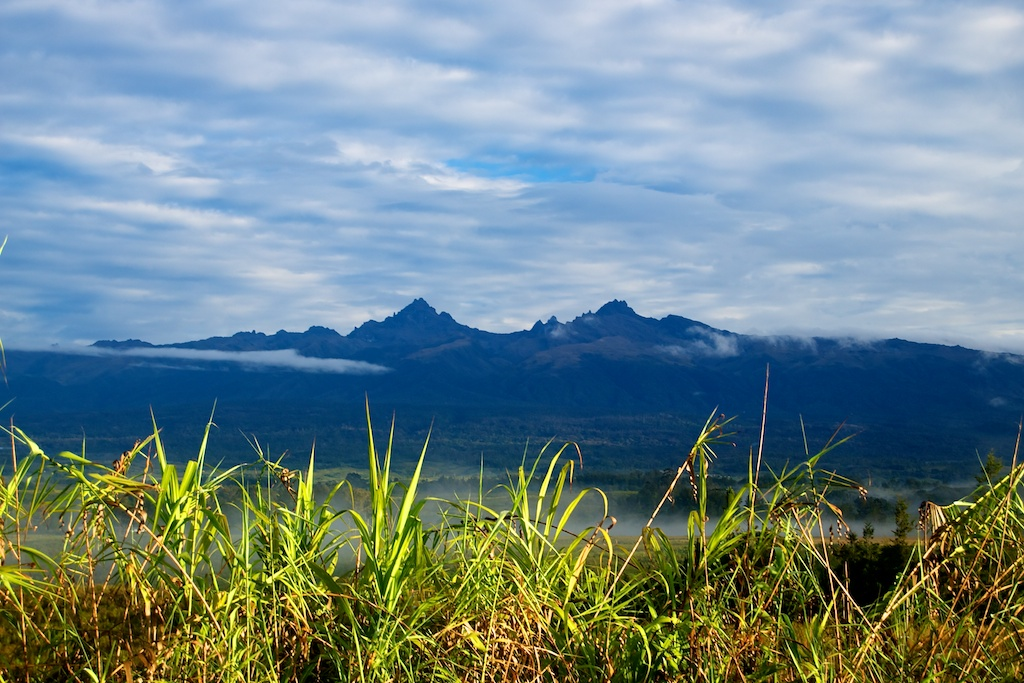
- Mount Giluwe from Ialibu.

Highest point
- Elevation: 4,367 m (14,327 ft)
- Prominence: 2,507 m (8,225 ft)
- Listing: Volcanic Seven Summits; Ultra
- Coordinates: 6°02′36″S 143°53′12″E

Naming
- Pronunciation: /ˈɡɪluːeɪ/

Geography
- Location within Papua New Guinea
- Location: Southern Highlands province, Papua New Guinea

Geology
- Rock age: 220,000–800,000 years
- Mountain type: Eroded shield volcano
- Last eruption: ~ 220,000 years ago

Climbing
- First ascent: 1934 by Mick Leahy
- Easiest route: hike

Mount Giluwe is the second highest mountain in Papua New Guinea at 4,367 metres (14,327 ft) (Mount Wilhelm being the highest), and the fifth highest peak on the island of New Guinea. It is located in the Southern Highlands province and is an old shield volcano with vast alpine grasslands. Ancient volcanic plugs form its two summits, with the central peak the highest and the west peak about 2 kilometres (1.2 mi) away at 4,300 m (14,108 ft). Giluwe has the distinction of being the highest volcano on the Australian continent and Oceania, and is thus one of the Volcanic Seven Summits.

== Geology ==
The original volcano on the site of Mount Giluwe formed roughly 650,000–800,000 years ago, probably as a stratovolcano of similar height to the current peak. Extensive Pleistocene glaciation eroded away much of the peak, leaving a series of volcanic plugs which form the present-day summits. A renewed episode of extensive volcanic eruptions formed the shield-like bulk of the current mountain between 220,000 and 300,000 years ago, and there is evidence that some of the lava erupted subglacially. During the last glaciations of the Ice Age, the upper slopes were covered by a massive ice cap over 150 m (500 ft) thick, from which only the main and east peaks protruded as nunataks above the ice surface. At its maximum extent, the ice cap was over 15 km (9 mi) across and covered an area greater than 100 km^{2} (40 mi^{2}). Outlet glaciers extended down as low as 3,200–3,500 m (10,500–11,500 ft), leaving a variety of deposits including glacial till and moraines. Although the glaciers are now long gone, numerous cirques and U-shaped valleys remain visible. The present-day climate on the summit plateau above roughly 3,400 m (11,150 ft) is cold enough for nightly frosts and occasional snowfall.

== History ==
Australian explorers Mick Leahy, and his brother Dan, were the first Westerners to reach the area and to discover and climb Mount Giluwe. However, another explorer Jack Hides also laid claim to be the first to discover Mount Giluwe after viewing the peaks from the west in 1935. Hides aptly named them the Minaret Mountains. However the name did not stick after Leahy went to London in 1935 and set up a hearing into the two opposing claims at the Royal Geographical Society. Leahy delivered his address on 21 November 1935 and the following year Leahy was awarded a grant from the Society and published his discoveries in their journal.

Being a part of the Volcanic 7 Summits, Mt Giluwe has attracted mountaineers from across the world. Satyarup Siddhanta became the first from India to climb Mt Giluwe as a part of his Volcanic 7 Summits journey. He is the youngest in the world to climb the Seven Summits and the Volcanic Seven Summits. This peak has been climbed by many climbers like James Stone who keeps a track of climbers who climbed the volcanic 7 summits in his blog clachliath. He is the first Briton to climb the volcanic 7 summits. Theodore Fairhurst climbed this peak too and he is the oldest person to climb all the 7 summits and volcanic 7 summits.

== Flora and fauna ==
The slopes of Mt. Giluwe exhibit a number of different biomes. Between 2,500 m (8,200 ft) and 2,800 m (9,190 ft) is the lower montane rainforest dominated by Nothofagus and Elaeocarpus with large Pandanus including the climbing Freycinetia, climbing bamboo, many gingers, orchids, ferns, herbs and shrubs including Begonia. Avian fauna include the endemic dwarf cassowary. Above this is the upper montane rainforest or moss forest, with stunted moss-shrouded trees such as Quintinia and conifers including Papuacedrus and Podocarpus. The ground is covered in ferns of all types including Blechnum, filmy ferns and the world's largest moss (Dawsonia superba) up to 55 cm (22 in) tall. Rhododendrons grow as epiphytes in the trees as do specialised cloud forest orchids.

At 3,200 m (10,500 ft), the moss forest opens into subalpine grassland. This transition marks the extent of glaciation during the last glacial maximum. The grassland is inhabited by towering endemic tree ferns. Tiny wildflowers grow amongst the tussock grasses including Veronica, Viola and Gaultheria. Streams flow in beds once scoured by glaciers, and wet bogs contain frog species found nowhere else on earth. This is also the domain of the endemic woolly ground cuscus, a species of possum. Patches of relict subalpine rainforest cling to the sheltered areas where frost is lessened. Scarlet Rhododendron and Dimorphanthera abound in the gnarled dwarf forest and white beard lichens hang in the branches. Above 3,400 m (11,200 ft) on the vast alpine plateau, creeping Astelia, cushion plants and mosses can be found near the numerous tarns, along with alpine blueberries (Vaccinium) and asters in rockier areas.

== See also ==
- Mount Giluwe Rural LLG
- List of highest mountains of New Guinea
- List of volcanoes in Papua New Guinea
- Lists of volcanoes
- Volcanic Seven Summits
