= Theodore Fairhurst =

Canadian entrepreneur, high-altitude mountaineer, author and public speaker

- Born: Theodore Frederick Fairhurst; April 18, 1947 (age 79); Westmount, Quebec, Canada.
- Education: Sir George Williams University now Concordia University
- Occupations: Real Estate entrepreneur, mountain climber, adventurer, artist, professional speaker
- Years active: 2006–present
- Known for: Oldest in the world, first North American, and ninth person to successfully climb Seven Summits and Volcanic Seven Summits Co-author of the book, Dare to reach, L'AVENTURE D'UNE VIE.

Theodore Fairhurst (born April 18, 1947) is a Canadian entrepreneur, high-altitude mountaineer, author and public speaker. On December 9, 2018, at the age of 71 years and 231 days, Fairhurst became the oldest person in the world, 1st North American, and 9th person in history to have scaled all the Seven Summits and Volcanic Seven Summits.

== Early years ==
Born in Westmount, Quebec of Canadian and English descent, Fairhurst grew up in Montreal. He went to Elizabeth Ballantyne Elementary School, Montreal West High School and Concordia University. He began drawing and painting at age four and studied at the Montreal Museum of Fine Arts in his youth. At 22 years old, his desire to see and experience the world began and he traveled to Europe and Asia. In the Netherlands (1972), Fairhurst transported young travelers around Europe and North Africa for several years.

Fairhurst continued producing art and exhibited at the Atrium Mensa in Amsterdam in 1974. He returned to Montreal in 1976 to advance his artistic career: "His interpretations of “man’s relationship to science and technology” painted on Plexiglas was a body of work that he is still very proud of. He had exhibitions here, in the U.S. and in Europe".

== Business ==
In 1983, Fairhurst built a real estate development business in Montreal. He was recognized by the City de Montreal for several of his projects in 1992. He continues to manage these companies.

== Mountaineering ==
Fairhurst became interested in mountains while living in Banff, Alberta in 1969. Later the same year, he went to Nepal and hiked alone for 32 days from Kathmandu to the Khumbu Glacier at the foot of Mount Everest. This experience motivated him to return and climb Mount Everest.

Between 2006 and 2014, Fairhurst completed the Seven Summits achievement by climbing Aconcagua, Denali, Vinson Massif, Mount Everest, Kilimanjaro, Mount Elbrus, Puncak Jaya, and Mount Kosciuszko. He also climbed Cho Oyu and Mont Blanc.

At the age of 70, within an approximate 8-month period from 2017 to 2018, Fairhurst successfully climbed 6 of the Volcanic Seven Summits. Unfortunately, when he was 75m from the top of his final climb, Ojos del Salado, he was shut down. Fairhurst ultimately completed the final climb on December 9, 2018, making him the ninth and first North American to complete both the Seven Summits and Volcanic Seven Summits. He currently holds the record for being the oldest person in the world to accomplish this feat.

== Mountaineering Timeline ==
=== Seven Summits ===
Date	Summit Name	Continent	Summit Height
January 23, 2006	Aconcagua	South America	22,841 ft / 6962m
May 29, 2007	Denali	North America	20,320 ft / 6190m
January 19, 2009	Vinson Massif	Antarctica	16,050 ft/4,892m
May 23, 2010	Mount Everest	Asia	29,035 ft / 8,850m
January 25, 2012	Kilimanjaro	Africa	19,341 ft / 5,895m
August 8, 2012	Mount Elbrus	Europe	18,510 ft / 5,642m
March 19, 2014	Puncak Jaya	Oceania	16024 ft / 4884m
April 10, 2014	Mount Kosciuszko	Australia	7,310 ft / 2,228m

=== Volcanic Seven Summits ===
Date	Summit Name	Continent	Summit Height
June 2, 2017	Mount Elbrus	Europe	18,510 ft / 5,642m
June 9, 2017	Kilimanjaro	Africa	19,341 ft / 5,895m
September 29, 2017	Mount Damavand	Asia	18,403 ft / 5,610m
October 9, 2017	Mount Giluwe	Oceania	14,327 ft / 4,367m
December 21, 2017	Pico de Orizaba	North America	18,491 ft / 5,636m
January 14, 2018	Mount Sidley	Antarctica	14,058 ft / 4285m
December 9, 2018	Ojos del Salado	South America	22,615 ft / 6,893m

=== Other Climbs ===
Date	Summit Name	Continent	Notes
September 29, 2006	Mont Blanc	Europe	Highest mountain in Alps (15,777 ft / 4,808.7 m)
October 5, 2008	Cho Oyu	Asia	6th highest mountain in the World (26,864 ft / 8,188 m)

== Video ==
Fairhurst's video Mount Everest "Ice Fall" went viral on YouTube with over 4.4 million views to date. He shot it with a helmet-mounted camera (POV) in the perspective of the climber. It has video images of the Khumbu Glacier as it breaks up descending from the Western Cwm to Base Camp, and was voted top 10 at Killarney 2011 Adventure Film Festival.

== Media ==
Author Jean-Pierre Lemaitre discussed Fairhurst in his book, 'Pas d’excuses’, stating: "I have been impressed by the way Ted Fairhurst managed his life. His philosophy of life is in harmony with the messages and techniques that I present in my book. That's why I decided to make him a key figure in my book. Page after page we discover how he managed to live his passions and to have the life he always wanted. Ted is an example for our youth!"

In 2010, Fairhurst served as the Honorary Chairman of the English Montreal School Board in its annual International Walk to School Day.

He was featured in the francophone article chronicling his quest to climb the 7 Summits and Volcanic 7 Summits: Des Laurentides à l’Everest: les hauts sommets de Theodore Fairhurst

== Other ==
Fairhurst serves as a director of the Esprit de Corps Foundation.

Beyond mountaineering, Fairhurst has achieved numerous adventures. On August 2, 2014, Fairhurst sailed a Volvo Ocean 60 across the North Atlantic to Quebec.

The same year, Fairhurst cycled the Italian and Austrian Alps from Lake Garda (Italy) to Bludenz (Austria).

In 2015, Fairhurst, Marc-Antoine Laporte and a predetermined team of cycling enthusiasts, mountain biked across Scotland's Highlands, in what is known the Highlands Coast-to-Coast Challenge.
