= Mario Trimeri =

Italian mountaineer

- Occupation: Mountaineer
- Known for: First person to complete the Volcanic Seven Summits challenge
- Website: www.mariotrimeri.com

Mario Trimeri is the first person to complete the Volcanic Seven Summits challenge and the second Italian to complete the Seven Summits mountaineering challenge. Trimeri initially failed to summit Mount Everest on his first attempt in 2003. He succeeded in the other six summits before completing Everest in 2007.
