= Sikkim Manipal Institute of Technology =

College in Majitar, India

- Logo of Sikkim Manipal Institute of Technology
- Type: Private-research
- Established: 1996; 30 years ago
- Accreditation: UGC; NAAC; NBA
- Academic affiliations: Sikkim Manipal University
- Director: Dr. Savitha G. Kini
- Academic staff: 250+
- Students: 3500+
- Location: Majitar, Pakyong district, Sikkim, India
- Campus: 33 acres (0.1 km^{2})
- Colours: Pickled bean & black
- Website: smu.edu.in/smit.html

Sikkim Manipal Institute of Technology is a private institute located in Majitar, Pakyong district, Sikkim, India. The institution offers various undergraduate and post-graduate courses in engineering, management, computer application and basic science.

== History ==
SMIT came into existence in year 1997 as a result of the agreement signed on 15 November 1992 between the Sikkim Government and Manipal Education & Medical Group (MEMG) as a joint venture to establish one of the first public–private partnership (PPP) based institutions in India., with the aim of imparting exemplary education and health care services in the state of Sikkim and countrywide. It first started from its temporary campus in Tadong, Sikkim, and later moved to its permanent campus in Majitar in the year 1999. SMIT is part of the Manipal Group that is in the field of education and health services in India and abroad. It is one of the institutes for technical education in East and North-East India. SMIT enjoys approval from the All India Council of Technical Education (AICTE) and the University Grants Commission (UGC). It is also accredited by the National Board of Accreditation (NBA) and the National Assessment and Accreditation Council (NAAC). In addition, it also holds ISO 9001 accreditation vide NS-EN ISO 9001:2000.

== Academics ==
SMIT has thirteen degree-granting departments which that offer undergraduate and post graduate programs in engineering, business, computer application and basic science and doctoral degrees in the above areas.

== Departments ==
The institute has 13 academic departments, awarding undergraduate (UG), postgraduate (PG), and doctoral (Ph.D.) degrees.

== Admission ==
SMIT Online Admission Test, a national level entrance test is conducted by the institute every year to select bright students. The test is being conducted for undergraduate engineering programs. Few seats for engineering courses are also reserved for MET and JEE. The institute grants different scholarships to meritorious and needy students.

== Ranking ==
University and college rankings

Engineering – India
- NIRF (2024): 201-300

Among engineering colleges in Eastern India, SMIT was ranked 2nd best private engineering college in 2022 and by India Today and The Week ranked it 3rd in 2022. Outlook ranked it 12th among top 100 Private Engineering Colleges of India in 2022.

The National Institutional Ranking Framework (NIRF) ranked the university between 201 and 300 in the engineering rankings in 2024.

== Accreditation ==
SMIT has been accredited with the following: • "A+" grade by NAAC (National Accreditation and Assessment Council. • The undergraduate (B.Tech.) programs run by CSE and IT department of SMIT has been accredited by the NBA (National Board of Accreditation). • All courses of SMIT have been approved by AICTE and UGC. • Institute has also been awarded ISO 9001:2008 certification and the same has been certified under Norsk Akkreditering, Norway.

== Research ==
Research at SMIT is headed by an associate director (R & D) with the other faculty members. Currently many research scholars are pursuing their Ph.D.s and some of them have been awarded doctoral degree. Currently, SMIT has thirteen research centres for basic and fundamental research. SMIT has successfully completed 52 sponsored projects worth Rs. 15.40 crores. The sponsors of those projects are AICTE, DST, DBT, DIETY, DRDO and ISRO and many other Govt. organizations . Many Professors of SMIT are among the top 2% scientists of the world as shown in a survey conducted by Stanford University, USA in 2022.

== Atal Incubation Centre ==
AIC-SMUTBI (Atal Incubation Centre - Sikkim Manipal University Technology Business Incubation Foundation) is one of the Technology Incubators supported by Atal Innovation Mission, NITI Aayog, Govt of India. The incubator has received a grant in aid of Rs 8 Crores to encourage startups/entrepreneurs and create an ecosystem for the entrepreneurial activities in the entire North Eastern Region. The incubator is located within the campus of SMIT.

Some of the companies that are presently incubated are:

- Yonika Infotainment Private Limited
- Amazing Adventure Private Limited
- Shoten Group
- Gladiolus Language Nectar
- Asal
- Shield Tech Infosec Private Limited

== Campus and facilities ==
The campus is situated in Sikkim on the bank of river Teesta.

== Hostels ==
All the students are provided twin sharing well furnished rooms with attached bathrooms. Limited Single (AC/Non AC) and Double (AC) also available. Night Canteen is available in all the hostels. Non interrupted electricity and water supply is ensured throughout the year. Automated Laundry System is being established. All the hostels have round the clock Wi-Fi connectivity and medical facilities.

== Food Court & Indoor Sports Complex (MARENA) ==
The institute has an ultra-modern indoor sports complex and a sprawling Food Court is also a part of the complex. Various facilities available are:Swimming Pool, Squash Court, Multi-Purpose Gym Hall, Yoga Room, Aerobics Room, Meditation Room, Table Tennis, Football, Carrom, Sauna Bath, Steam Bath, Badminton Court, Basketball Court, Volleyball, Futsal Court, Auditorium and Tennis Court.

== Central Library ==
The Central Library is a two storied building with 2960 sq m carpet area. The total seating capacity of Library is 428 users at a time. SMIT Library has built up a collection on all branches of Engineering, Science and Management.

• Central Library is a member of DELNET and National Digital Library for online access of e-journals and e-books. • Library LAN has become a part of campus wide Network, which has made it possible for the academic community of various departments to access information.

== General Facilities ==
The shopping Centre of the campus consists of the following facilities: Union Bank of India, ATM of Axis Bank & Union Bank of India, Post Office, Stationery Shop, Binding, Lamination, Xerox Shop, Beauty Parlor, Barber Shop, Pharmacy etc. In addition, stationery shop, general store and SBI ATM are located within the academic premises.

== Student culture and activities ==
There are seven active technical and cultural clubs on campus and students have taken part and gained accolades in various events and fests such as SAE Supra, ACM-ICPC, Nasscom Smart City Hackathon, Spring Fest among many others. Students also arrange for and participate in various intra-collegiate events such as the annual techno-cultural festival, Kaalrav (held in March), TEDxSMIT (held in October), inter-departmental fests, etc. The editorial board publishes the annual college magazine, The Smitsonian (September). Some clubs are:

- Chatter
- Chromatics
- Crew
- Google Developer Student Clubs - SMIT
- Decoders
- Illusion
- Innovision
- SMITMUN
- UDAAN

In order to address student grievances, the college also has an active Student Council and a Mess and Canteen Committee.

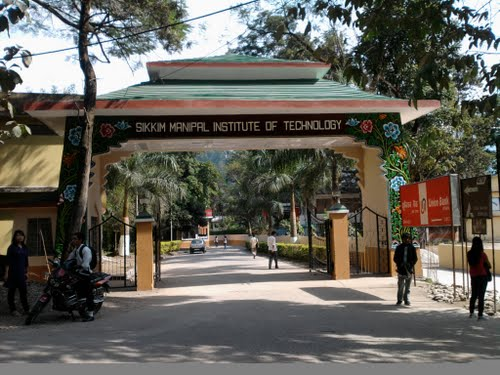
Main Entrance to SMIT

== Notable alumni ==
- Satyarup Siddhanta, Indian mountaineer.
- Shivangi Singh, First female Indian naval pilot.
