= Satyarup Siddhanta =

Bangalore-based Indian mountaineer

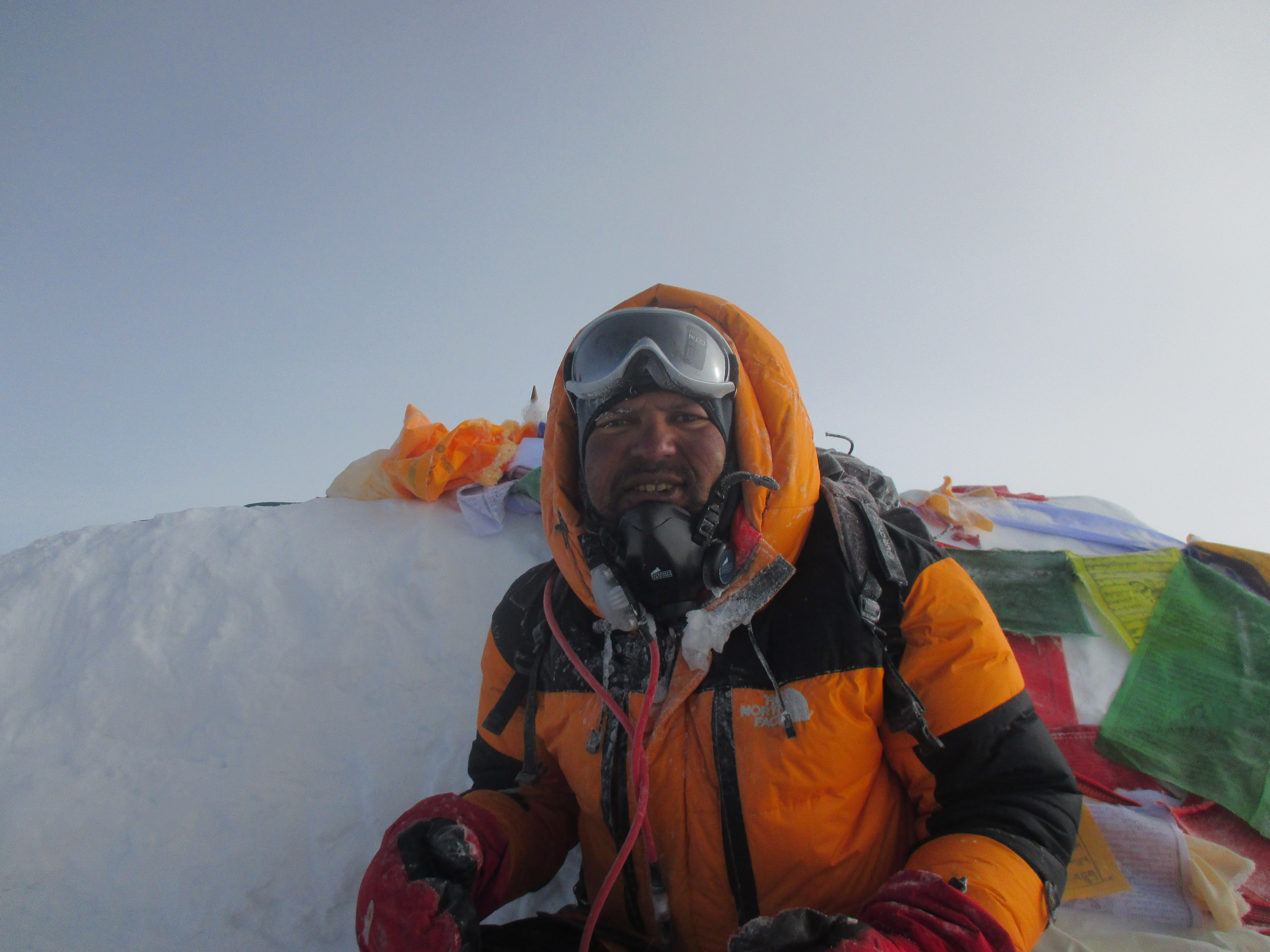
- Satyarup Siddhanta on the top of Mount Everest
- Born: 29 April 1983 (age 43); Kolkata, West Bengal, India
- Occupation: Mountaineer/Engineer
- Website: SatyarupSiddhanta.com

Satyarup Siddhanta (born 29 April 1983) is a Bangalore-based world record holder Indian mountaineer. Satyarup became the youngest mountaineer in the world and the first from India to climb both the Seven Summits and Volcanic Seven Summits on 15 January 2019 at 10:10 pm Chile time. Guinness World Records approved this claim.

== Summary of records ==
On 15 December 2017 he summited Vinson Massif, becoming only the fifth Indian civilian to complete the seven summits (Messner's List and Bass List). He is the first civilian to accomplish this feat from Karnataka (Residence State) and West Bengal (Home State). Satyarup, a certified mountaineer from Himalayan Mountaineering Institute, Darjeeling has skied the last degree to the South Pole, a distance of 111 km.

Satyarup became:

- First in the world to climb Mt Gupt Parvat, a virgin peak in Himachal Pradesh, India - June 2024
- Fastest Indian to climb Mt Nelion (Mt Kenya), a very technical volcanic peak in Kenya
- First from India to climb Mt Brammah - 1, Kishtwar Himalayas, India first Indian ascent and first in the world through a new route. This mountain was summitted after 43 years.
- First from India to complete Volcanic Seven Summits
- First from India to climb both the 7 Summits and Volcanic 7 summits
- First from India to climb Mt Sidley, highest volcano of Antarctica
- First from India to climb Mt Giluwe, the highest volcano of Papua New Guinea
- First from India to climb Mt Wilhelm, the highest mountain of Papua New Guinea
- Third from India to climb Mt Ojos Del Salado, the highest volcano in the world, at Chile
- First person to play the Indian National Anthem on flute in Antarctica

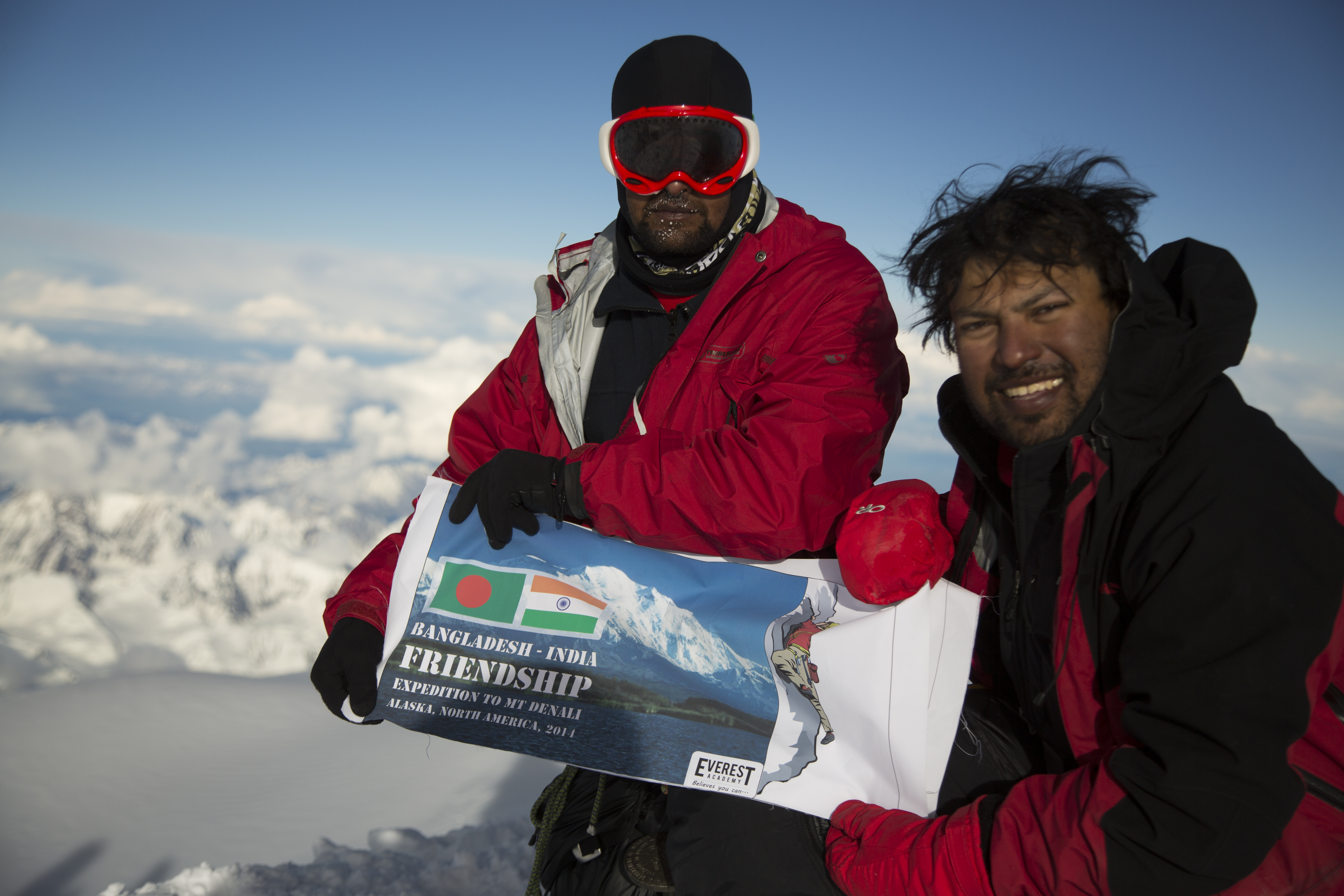
Satyarup Siddhanta with Musa Ibrahim in an Indo Bangladesh climb to improve the ties between the countries.

== Biography ==
=== Early life ===
Satyarup Siddhanta was born in Kolkata and brought up in the small town of Berhampore, West Bengal. He attended Mary Immaculate School, Berhampore and passed Higher Secondary from Gurudas Tarasundari Institution, Berhampore. He obtained a B. Tech in Computer Science and Engineering from Sikkim Manipal Institute of Technology, Sikkim. He started working as a software engineer in Bangalore in 2005 and has been an active member of Bangalore Mountaineering Club since 2008. He is now a software consultant and also runs expeditions through his organization Winners and Achievers and introduces mountains to kids and amateurs.

=== Works and achievements ===
Satyarup has been awarded the highest state award in the field of mountaineering Radhanath Sikdar Tenzing Norgay Adventure Award 2016 by the State Youth Services Department, Govt of West Bengal.

Satyarup has been awarded the Excellence in Mountaineering award, 2018 by State Youth Services Department, Govt of West Bengal

Satyarup has been awarded with the special award in mountaineering 2019 by the Chief Minister of West Bengal at Khelasree 2019 held at Netaji Indoor Stadium Kolkata.

Satyarup was presented with the Youth Award in the Bangalore Youth Festival at the Kanteerva Stadium.

Satyarup has been invited by IIT Kanpur in their prestigious Scholars in Residence Program 2019–20.

He was felicitated by the West Bengal Commission for Protection of Child Rights (WBCPCR) in Kolkata on the occasion of State Child Protection Day on 9 June 2018. He dedicated his Kilimanjaro, 2018 climb to the cause of Child Protection and held aloft the WBCPCR poster at the summit.

He played the Indian National Anthem on flute amidst extreme climatic conditions in Antarctica.

Satyarup presented his poster at the International Centre for Integrated Mountain Development.

ASEAN entrusted Satyarup and his team the mission to take the ASEAN flag, the Indonesia Flag and the India flag to the summit of Mt Carstensz Pyramid as a commemorative climb to mark the 50th Anniversary of ASEAN and 25th anniversary of Dialogue with India. Satyarup gave a talk at the ASEAN headquarters, Jakarta. As a mark of respect, the pictures of the flag giving ceremony is showcased on the walls of Indian High Commission, Indonesia.

He was felicitated by the Governor of West Bengal after he successfully climbed Mount Everest on 21 May 2016.

He has been delivering motivational talks at several renowned institutions and forums, like ASEAN, SAHA Institute of Nuclear Physics, IISc, Bangalore, IIT Kanpur, IISWBM, IEI, TEDX and corporates like Cognizant, Sasken, HSBC, Bandhan Bank, IET, Altimetrik, Pinnacle, IMRB, Trivium, Element14, Aditya Birla Capital, Students of Indian Museum, CERN, INFN etc.

== Mountaineering timeline ==
=== The seven highest summits ===
- 29 June 2012 and 14 June 2018 : Mount Kilimanjaro (5,885m/19,308 ft) Summit. On 29 June 2012, at 9:30 a.m, Satyarup led a team of nine to Mount Kilimanjaro, the highest peak of Africa from the Machame Route. On 14 June 2018, he led a team of 5 to the top again via the same route.
- 27 June 2013: Mount Elbrus (West summit:18,510 ft (5,640 m) and East summit:18,442 ft (5,621 m). On 27 June 2013, Satyarup summitted the highest mountain of Europe.
- 13 January 2014: Mount Aconcagua (22,841 ft; 6,962 m). Satyarup climbed Mount Aconcagua, the highest non-technical mountain in the world on 13 January 2014 unguided from the normal route.
- 23 June 2014: Denali(20,322 ft; 6,194 m). Satyarup climbed Denali on 23 June 2014 from West Buttress route unguided.
- 12 June 2015: Mount Kosciuszko (7,310 ft; 2,230 m) Satyarup successfully climbed the highest peak in Australia by the normal route unguided on 12 June 2015.
- 21 May 2016: Mount Everest (29,029 ft; 8,848 m) Satyarup successfully climbed the highest peak of Everest, taking the standard route from Nepal Side on 21 May 2016.
- 13 June 2017:Carstensz Pyramid (16,024 ft; 4,884 m) Satyarup successfully climbed the highest peak of Oceania by the Suangama Jungle Route. It was a commemorative climb to celebrate 50 years of ASEAN and 25 years of Bilateral talk between India and ASEAN. The flag giving ceremony happened at the headquarters of ASEAN at Jakarta where Satyarup was handed 3 flags - The India flag, the Indonesia flag and the ASEAN flag.
- 15 December 2017 Vinson Massif (16,050 ft; 4,890 m) Satyarup successfully climbed the highest peak in Antarctica, taking the normal route and completing the seven summits.

=== The seven volcanic summits ===
- Mt Kilimanjaro (Africa) twice on 29 June 2012 & 14 June 2018
- Mt Elbrus (Europe) on 27 June 2013
- Mt Ojos Del Salado (South America) on 15 January 2018 - 2nd Indian to summit after Malli Mastan Babu
- Mt Damavand (Asia) on 10 September 2018 - Led a woman's team from India
- Mt Giluwe (Oceania) on 9 November 2018 - 1st Indian to summit
- Mt Pico De Orizaba (North America) on 5 December 2018 (Indian time: 2:09 am on 6 December 2018)
- Mt Sidley (Antarctica) on 15 January 2019, 10:10 pm Chile time, 2019

=== Other notable adventures ===
- Feb 2024: Satyarup went for a scientific exploration at Ethiopia and got scientific samples for research purposes and collaborated with the Microbiology departement of Burdwan University, West Bengal. Studies says the research team could identify some rare bacterias that could survive more than 65 degree C.
- June 2022: Satyarup attempted Mt Indrasan and Mt Deo Tibba. He had to turn back from Indrasan around 30m from below the summit after he had technical problems which resulted in severe exhaustion. He eventually summited Deo Tibba in Himachal fighting a dangerous blizzard.
- Nov-Dec 2020, Satyarup attempted Mt Ama Dablam and had to turn back from near 3rd camp after a tendency of frost bite in his fingers. While coming down he had an accident near to camp 2 and had to get evacuated in a long line rescue.
- 23 September 2014: Mont Blanc in France
- 28 December 2017: Skied the Last Degree to South Pole covering 111 km distance over 6 days and dragging a 50 kg sled
- 15 January 2018: Became the second Indian to climb the highest volcano of the world, Mt. Ojos Del Salado, Chile
- 14 November 2018: Became the 1st Indian to climb Mount Wilhelm, the highest peak of Papua New Guinea.

== Controversy ==
In 2016, Satyarup was initially denied the certification of having climbed Everest due to the alleged forgery of Rathod couple from Maharashtra. Satyarup lodged a complaint against the police couple who morphed his pictures from the summit. After a thorough investigation, a case was lodged against the duo under Section 66(d) of Information Technology Act, 2008. A 10-year ban from mountaineering was imposed on the couple by Nepal Tourism.

== See also ==
- Indian summiters of Mount Everest - Year wise
- List of Mount Everest summiters by number of times to the summit
- List of Mount Everest records of India
- List of Mount Everest records
