= Mount Hampton =

Shield volcano in Antarctica

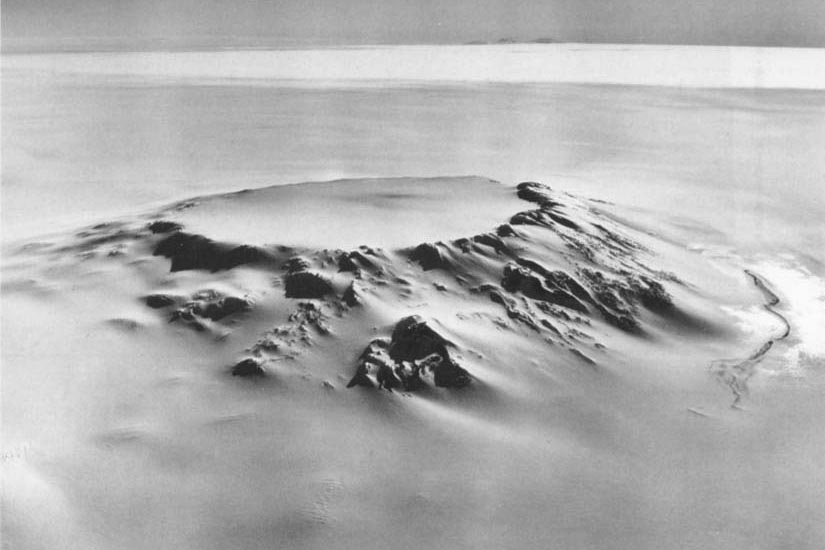
- The caldera of Mt. Hampton viewed from the northwest.

Highest point
- Elevation: 3,323 m (10,902 ft)
- Coordinates: 76°29′0″S 125°48′0″W

Geography
- Location within Antarctica
- Location: Marie Byrd Land, Antarctica
- Parent range: Executive Committee Range

Geology
- Mountain type: Shield volcano
- Volcanic field: Marie Byrd Land Volcanic Province

Mount Hampton (Note: Discovered by the USAS on a flight, December 15, 1940, and named for Ruth Hampton, Dept. of the Interior member of the USAS Executive Committee. Two field expeditions took place in 1967-1968 and 1990-1991.) is a shield volcano with a circular ice-filled caldera. It is a twin volcano with Whitney Peak to the northwest and has erupted phonolite rocks. It is the northernmost of the volcanoes which comprise the Executive Committee Range in Marie Byrd Land, Antarctica, and was active during the Miocene.

== Geography and geology ==
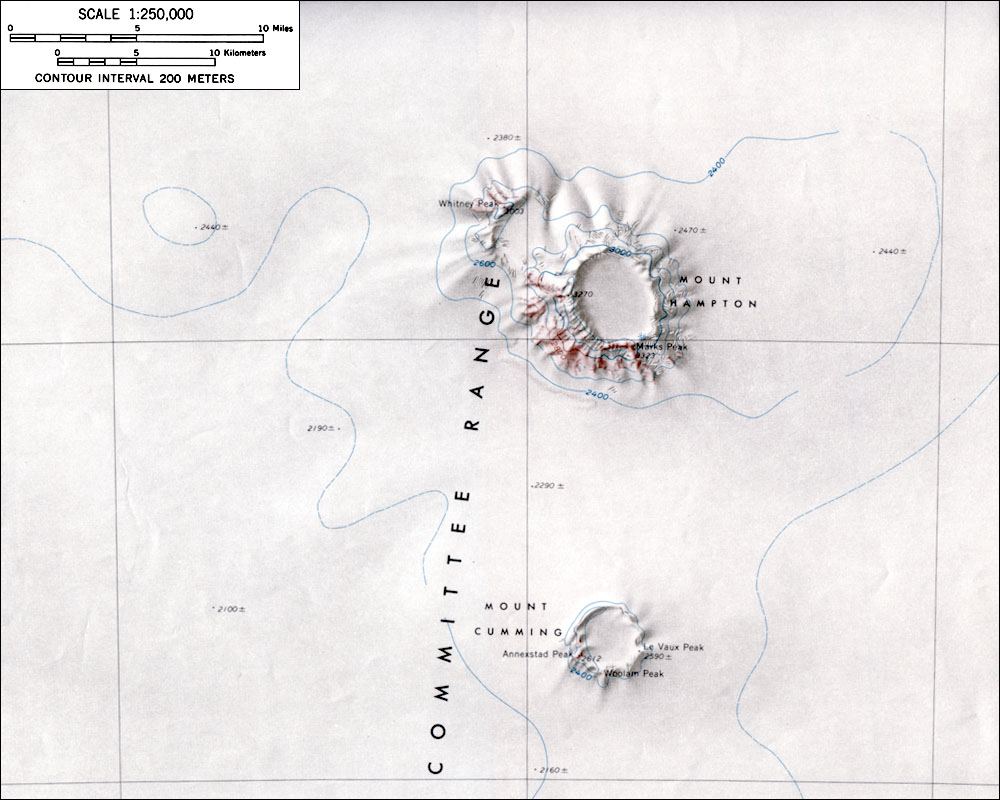
Topographic map of Mount Hampton from USGS Mount Hampton

Mount Hampton is the northernmost volcano of the Executive Committee Range in Marie Byrd Land, Antarctica. It has the form of a symmetrical uneroded shield volcano with an "impressive" appearance and an ice-filled 6.5-by-5.5-kilometre-wide (4.0-by-3.4-mile) caldera. Like other volcanoes in the Executive Committee Range, it is a paired volcano with the northwesterly 3,003-metre-high (9,852-foot) Whitney Peak and the southeasterly 3,323-metre-high (10,902-foot) Marks Peak, which is the main summit of Mount Hampton. (Note: Sometimes the maximum height of Mount Hampton is given as 3,325 metres (10,909 ft).) The northwesterly summit is associated with its own caldera, which is partly cut by the Mount Hampton caldera on the southeastern flank and buried by the lava flows from the latter. The centres of the two calderas are about 8 kilometres (5.0 mi) apart. Based on outcrops, it appears that most of the volcano is formed by flow rocks, but cinder and lava bombs occur at parasitic vents.

The mountain rises about 1 kilometre (0.62 mi) above the surface of the West Antarctic Ice Sheet, which buries most of the edifice, and moraine ridges are found at its base on the ice sheet. Owing to climate conditions, the persistence of permanent ice atop of the mountain is unlikely over the long term; erosion there appears to have been episodic with maxima during interglacials, and there is no evidence of cirque formation. Lichens have been found on the mountain.

=== Composition ===
The volcano is formed by phonolite rocks, but parasitic vents have also erupted basanite, and Whitney Peak also erupted trachyte and benmoreite. Hawaiite has been reported as well. The volcanic rocks contain augite and feldspar; further, spinel-containing lherzolite xenoliths have been found. In general, composition is unique for each volcano in the Executive Committee Range.

== Eruption history ==
Mount Hampton is one of the oldest volcanoes of Antarctica and was active during the Miocene. Despite this, it is less eroded than some younger volcanoes in the region; in general, the ages of the Marie Byrd Land volcanoes are not correlated to their erosion status. It appears that Whitney Peak is the older half of the edifice and that volcanic activity then migrated to Mount Hampton. More generally, volcanism in the Executive Committee Range migrated southwards over time at an average rate of 0.7 centimetres per year (0.28 in/year), although Mount Hampton and its southern neighbour Mount Cumming were simultaneously active 10 million years ago.

Last parasitic eruptions took place around 11.4 million years ago, and the youngest radiometric dates are 8.3 million years. As at other volcanoes of Marie Byrd Land, the parasitic activity at Mount Hampton occurred after a long period of dormancy. However, the presence around the caldera rim of snow-covered inactive 10–20-metre-high (33–66-foot) ice towers (Note: Ice towers form when gas escaping from fumaroles freezes in the cold Antarctic air. Exposed ice towers on Mount Hampton must be recent given the high winds that would otherwise erode them.) indicate that the mountain is geothermally active and may have erupted during the Holocene. Later research suggested that the ice towers were actually formed by wind-driven erosion of snow and ice. There is no evidence of geothermal processes, and seismic activity recorded at the volcano may be due to volcano-tectonic processes or due to ice movement.

== See also ==
- List of volcanoes in Antarctica

== Sources ==
- Carracedo, Ana; Rodes, Angel; Stuart, Finlay; Smellie, John (April 2016). "Understanding complex exposure history of Mount Hampton, West Antarctica using cosmogenic 3He, 21Ne and 10Be in olivine". EGUGA: EPSC2016–17178. Bibcode:2016EGUGA..1817178C.
- Carracedo, A.; Rodés, Á.; Smellie, J. L.; Stuart, F. M. (15 February 2019). "Episodic erosion in West Antarctica inferred from cosmogenic 3He and 10Be in olivine from Mount Hampton". Geomorphology. 327: 438–445. Bibcode:2019Geomo.327..438C. doi:10.1016/j.geomorph.2018.11.019. ISSN 0169-555X. S2CID 134667311.
- LeMasurier, W.E. "Volcanic geology of central Marie Byrd Land". Antarctic Journal of the United States. 3 (4): 90–91.
- Lemasurier, Wesley E.; Rocchi, Sergio (1 March 2005). "Terrestrial record of post‐eocene climate history in marie byrd land, west antarctica". Geografiska Annaler: Series A, Physical Geography. 87 (1): 57. doi:10.1111/j.0435-3676.2005.00244.x. ISSN 0435-3676. S2CID 128880997.
- LeMasurier, Wesley E.; Wade, F. Alton (18 October 1968). "Fumarolic Activity in Marie Byrd Land, Antarctica". Science. 162 (3851): 352. Bibcode:1968Sci...162..352L. doi:10.1126/science.162.3851.352. ISSN 0036-8075. PMID 17836656. S2CID 19337445.
- LeMasurier, W. E.; Rex, D. C. (1989). "Evolution of linear volcanic ranges in Marie Byrd Land, West Antarctica". Journal of Geophysical Research. 94 (B6): 7223. Bibcode:1989JGR....94.7223L. doi:10.1029/JB094iB06p07223. ISSN 0148-0227.
- Lough, A. C.; Barcheck, C. G.; Wiens, D. A.; Nyblade, A.; Aster, R. C.; Anandakrishnan, S.; Huerta, A. D.; Wilson, T. J. (December 2012). "Subglacial volcanic seismicity in Marie Byrd Land detected by the POLENET/ANET seismic deployment". AGUFM. 2012: T41B–2587. Bibcode:2012AGUFM.T41B2587L.
- Panter, K. S.; Wilch, T. I.; Smellie, J. L.; Kyle, P. R.; McIntosh, W. C. (2021). "Chapter 5.4b Marie Byrd Land and Ellsworth Land: petrology". Geological Society, London, Memoirs. 55 (1): 577–614. doi:10.1144/M55-2019-50. ISSN 0435-4052. S2CID 233620473.
- Rocchi, Sergio; LeMasurier, Wesley E.; Vincenzo, Gianfranco Di (1 July 2006). "Oligocene to Holocene erosion and glacial history in Marie Byrd Land, West Antarctica, inferred from exhumation of the Dorrel Rock intrusive complex and from volcano morphologies". GSA Bulletin. 118 (7–8): 991–1005. Bibcode:2006GSAB..118..991R. doi:10.1130/B25675.1. ISSN 0016-7606.
- LeMasurier, W. E.; Thomson, J. W., eds. (1990). Volcanoes of the Antarctic Plate and Southern Oceans. American Geophysical Union. p. 512 pp. ISBN 0-87590-172-7.
- Scharon, L.; Early, T. "Paleomagnetic investigations in Marie Byrd Land". Antarctic Journal of the United States. 3 (4): 92.
- "Mount Hampton". Geographic Names Information System. United States Geological Survey, United States Department of the Interior.
- Wilch, T. I.; McIntosh, W. C.; Panter, K. S. (1 January 2021). "Chapter 5.4a Marie Byrd Land and Ellsworth Land: volcanology". Geological Society, London, Memoirs. 55 (1): 515–576. doi:10.1144/M55-2019-39. ISSN 0435-4052. S2CID 233632723.
- "Skiing the Pacific Ring of Fire and Beyond". Amar Andalkar's Ski Mountaineering and Climbing Site. 2007 [1997].
