= Mount Sidley =

Volcano in Antarctica

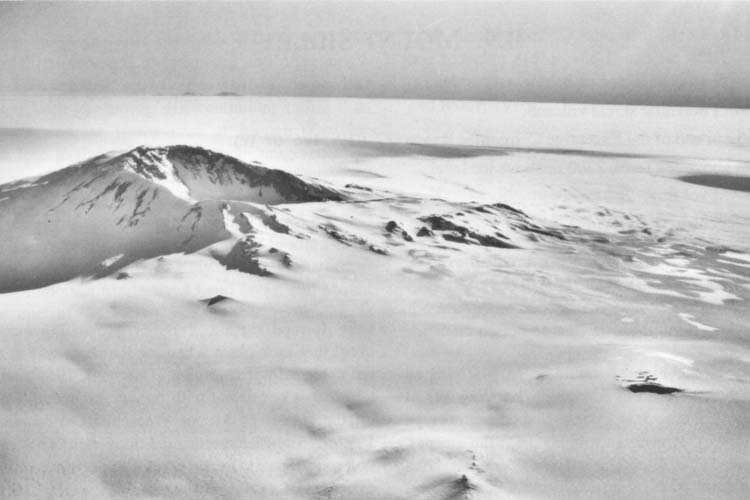
- Aerial view of the Mount Sidley caldera from the southwest

Highest point
- Elevation: 4,285 m (14,058 ft)
- Prominence: 2,517 m (8,258 ft)
- Listing: Volcanic Seven Summits; Ultra
- Coordinates: 77.04°S 126.10°W

Geography
- Location within Antarctica
- Location: Marie Byrd Land, Antarctica
- Parent range: Executive Committee Range

Geology
- Mountain type: Shield volcano
- Volcanic field: Marie Byrd Land Volcanic Province

Climbing
- First ascent: 1990 by Bill Atkinson (New Zealand)

Mount Sidley is the highest dormant volcano in Antarctica, and a member of the Volcanic Seven Summits (the highest volcanoes on each of the seven continents) with a summit elevation of 4,181–4,285 metres (13,717–14,058 ft). It is a massive, mainly snow-covered shield volcano, and the highest of the five volcanoes that comprise the Executive Committee Range of Marie Byrd Land. The feature is marked by a 5-kilometre-wide (3.1 mi) caldera on the southern side and stands northeast of Mount Waesche in the southern part of the range.

== History ==
The mountain was discovered by Rear Admiral Richard E. Byrd on an airplane flight, on November 18, 1934, and named by him for Mabelle E. Sidley, the daughter of William Horlick who was a contributor to the 1933–1935 Byrd Antarctic Expedition. Despite its height, the volcano's extremely remote location means that it is little known even in the mountaineering world compared to the much more accessible Mount Erebus, the second-highest Antarctic volcano, which is located near the U.S. and New Zealand bases on Ross Island.

The first recorded ascent of Mount Sidley was by New Zealander Bill Atkinson on January 11, 1990, whilst working in support of a United States Antarctic Program scientific field party.

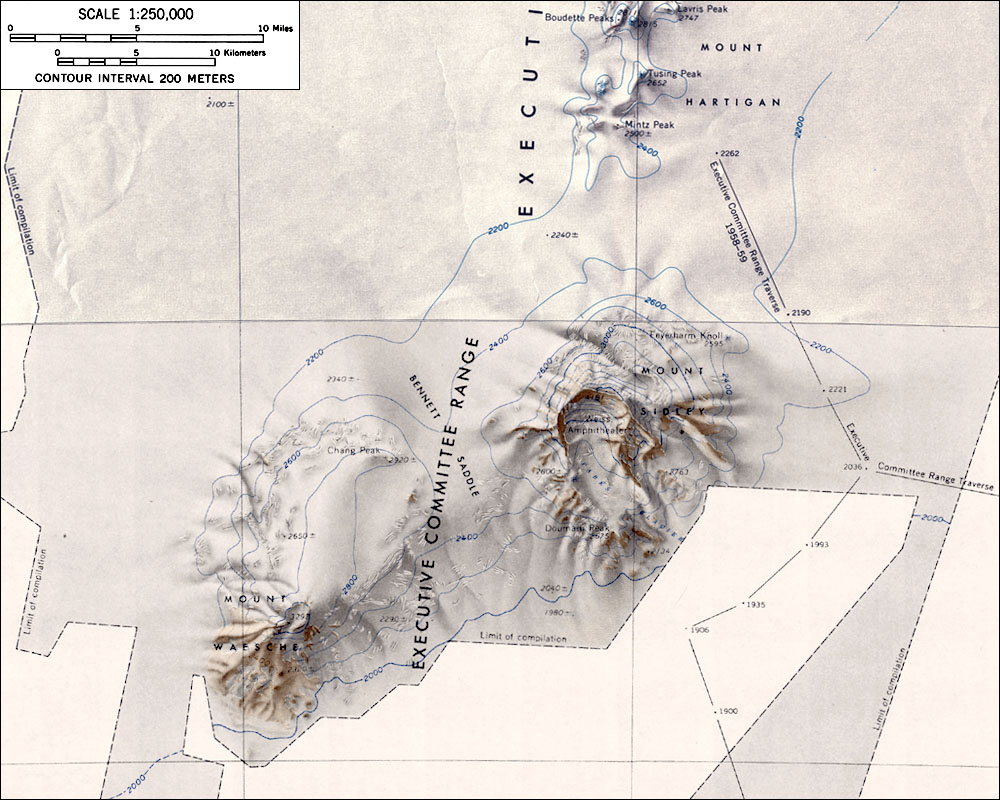
Topographic map of Mounts Sidley and Waesche (1:250,000 scale)

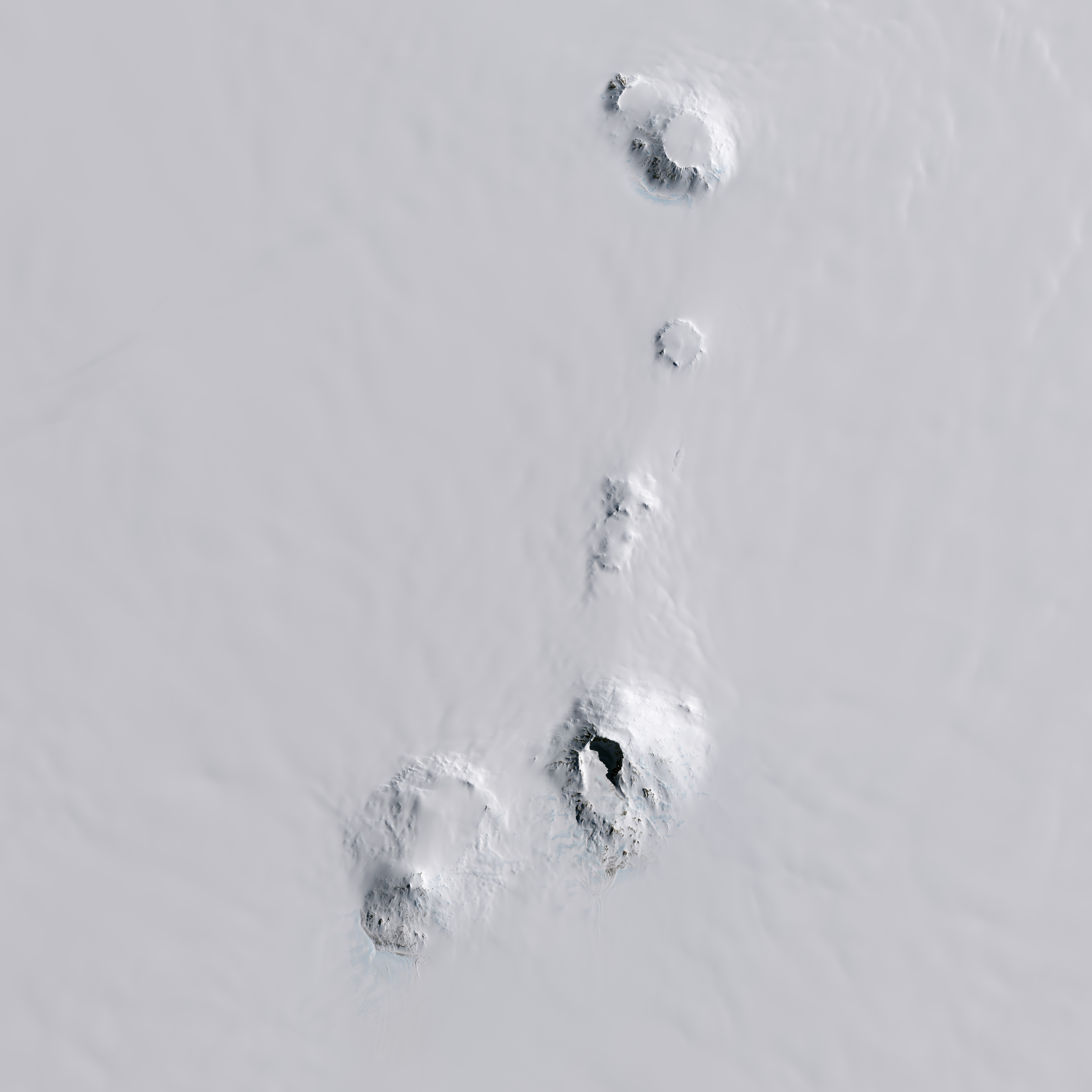
Landsat 8 image of Mount Sidley and the Executive Committee Range

== See also ==
- List of volcanoes in Antarctica
