= Executive Committee Range =

Mountain range in Antarctica

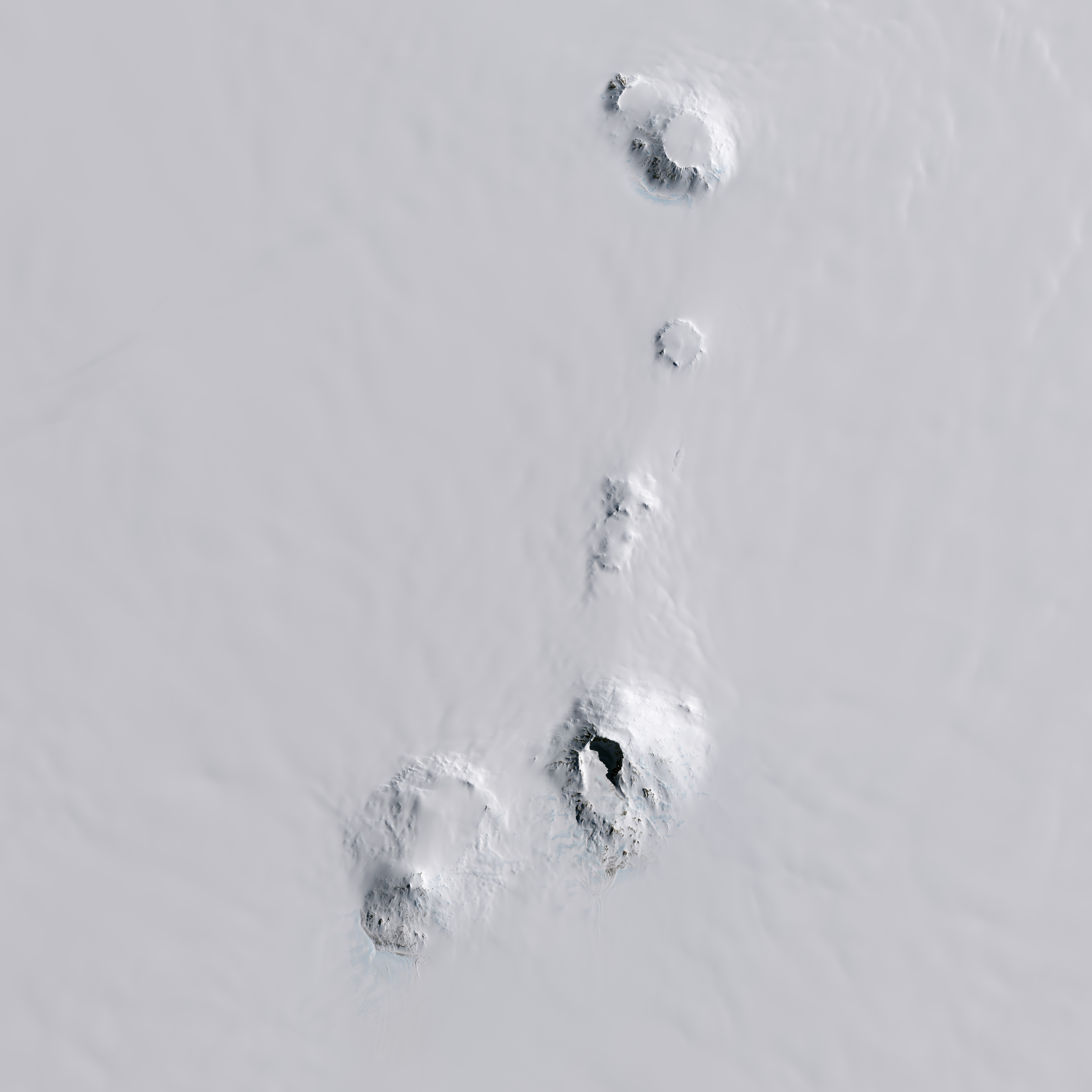
- 2014 Landsat 8 image of the five mountains in the Executive Committee Range

Highest point
- Peak: Mount Sidley
- Elevation: 4,285 m (14,058 ft)

Geography
- Location within Antarctica
- Continent: Antarctica
- Region: Marie Byrd Land
- Range coordinates: 76°50′S 126°00′W

Geology
- Volcanic field: Marie Byrd Land Volcanic Province

The Executive Committee Range (76°50′S 126°00′W) is a range consisting of five major volcanoes, which trends north-south for 50 nautical miles (93 km; 58 mi) along the 126th meridian west, in Marie Byrd Land, Antarctica.

== Location ==
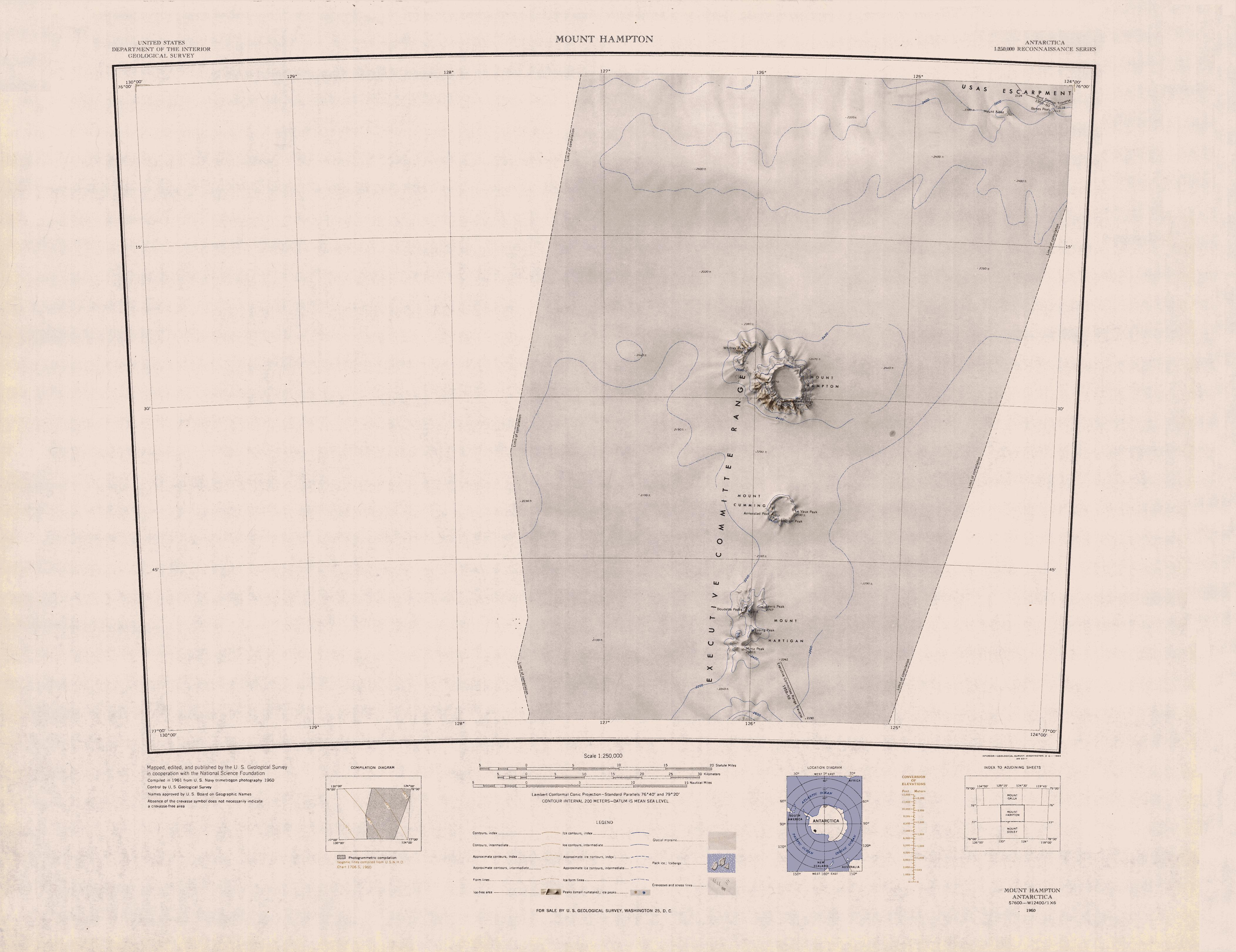
North of range in southeast of map

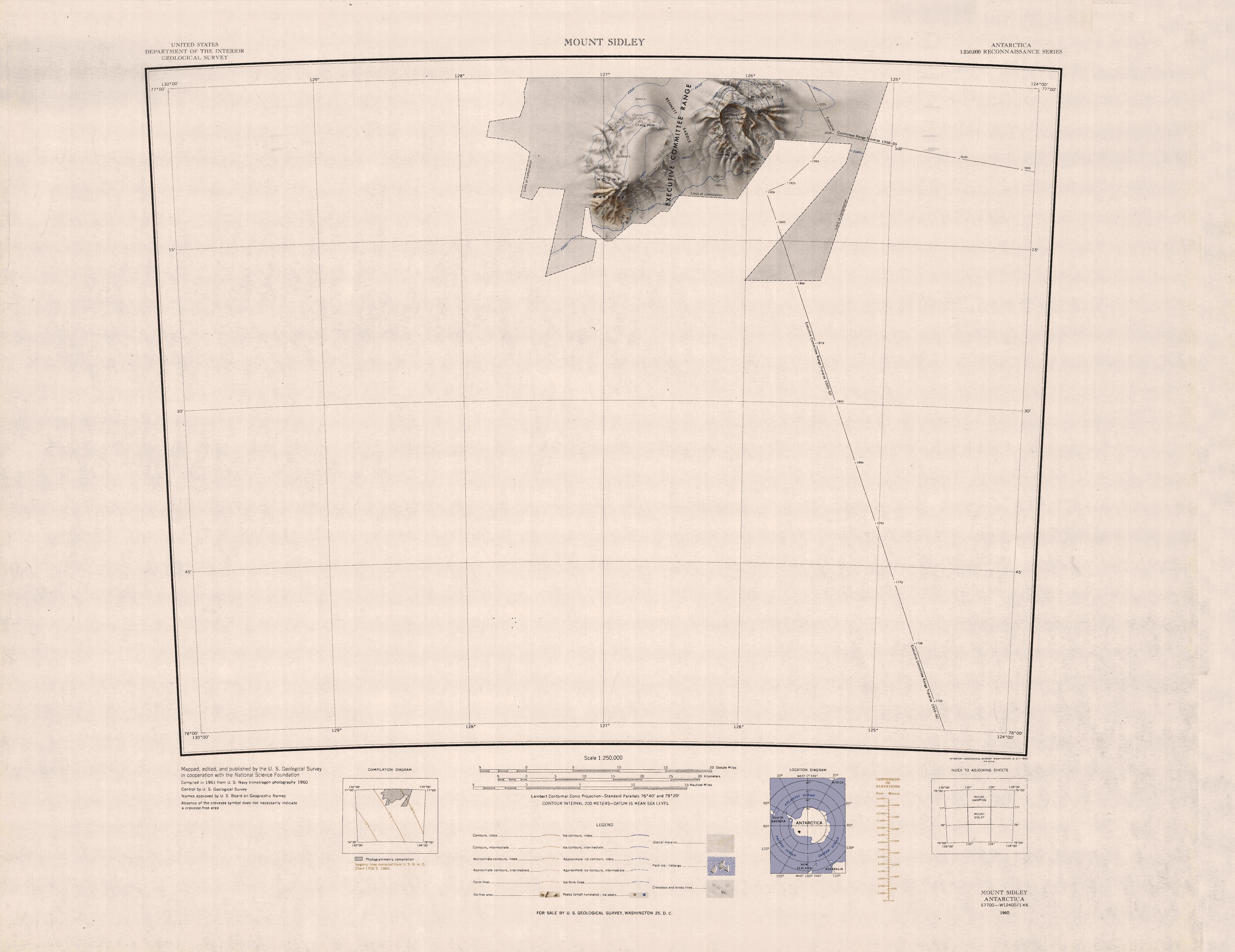
South of range in north of map

The Executive Committee Range is south of the eastern end of the Usas Escarpment. The mountains, from north to south, are Mount Hampton, Mount Camming, Mount Hartigan, Mount Sidley, and Mount Waesche. Named features of Mount Hampton include Whitney Peak and Marks Peak. Named features of Mount Cuming include Annexstad Peak, Le Vaux Peak, and Woolam Peak. Named features of Mount Hartigan include Lavris Peak, Boudette Peaks, Tusing Peak, and Mintz Peak. Named features of Mount Sidley include Feyerharm Knoll, Weiss Amphitheater, Parks Glacier, and Doumani Peak. Named features of Mout Waescher include Bennett Saddle and Chang Peak.

== Recent and ongoing magmatism ==
In November 2013, Lough et al. reported deep, long-period volcanic earthquakes centered at depths of 30–40 km approximately 55 km south of Mount Sidley that were interpreted as indications of present deep crustal magmatic activity beneath the Executive Committee Range. Ice-penetrating radar results reported in this study indicated a sub-ice topographic feature, interpreted as a volcano, above the seismic swarms. The study also reported a mid-icecap (1400 m depth) ash layer about 8,000 years old that was interpreted as probably originating at nearby Mount Waesche.

== Discovery and name ==
The complete range was discovered by the United States Antarctic Service Expedition (1939–41), during a flyover of the area on 15 December 1940, and named for the Executive Committee of the Expedition. Four of the five mountains are named in honor of individual members of the committee. Mount Sidley, the most imposing mountain in the range, was discovered and named by Rear Admiral Richard E. Byrd in 1934. The entire range was mapped in detail by the United States Geological Survey (USGS) from surveys and United States Navy trimetrogon photography from 1958 to 1960.

== Mount Hampton ==
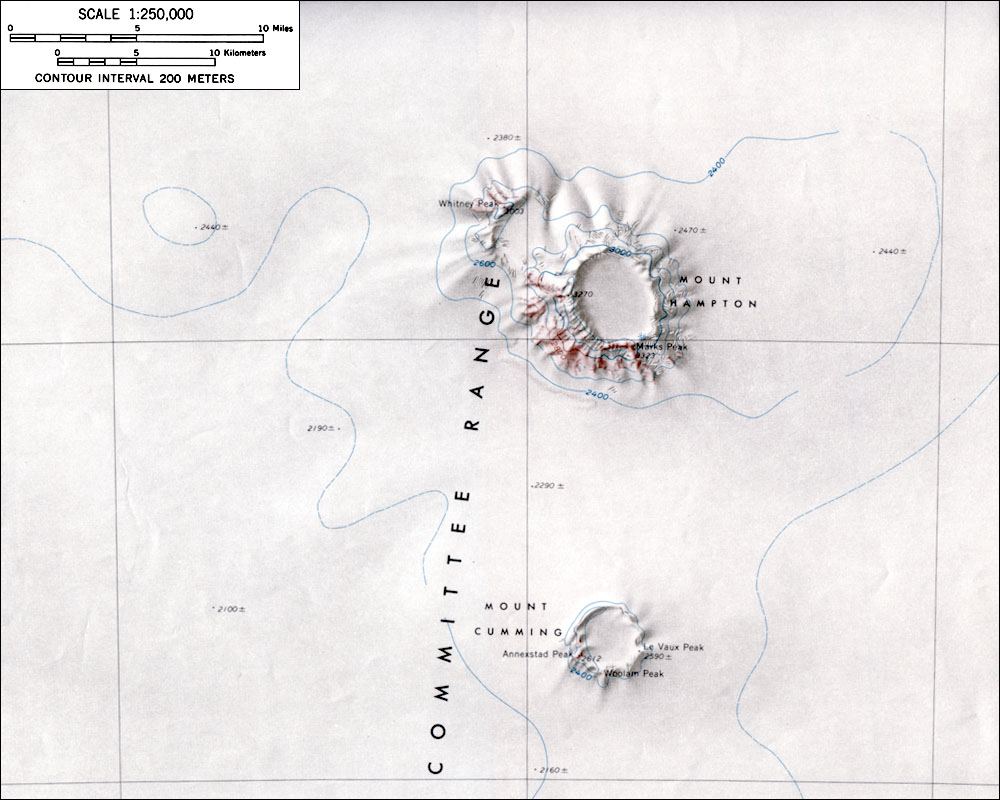
Topographical map of northern portion of Executive Committee Range

76°29′S 125°48′W. An impressive mountain 3,325 metres (10,909 ft) high with a circular ice-filled crater occupying much of the summit area. It is the northernmost of the extinct volcanoes which comprise the Executive Committee Range. Discovered by the United States Antarctic Service (USAS) on a flight, December 15, 1940, and named for Ruth Hampton, United States Department of the Interior member of the USAS Executive Committee. Mapped in detail by USGS from surveys and United States Navy trimetrogon photography, 1958–60.

=== Whitney Peak ===
76°26′S 126°03′W. A conspicuous peak 3,005 metres (9,859 ft) high rising 3 nautical miles (5.6 km; 3.5 mi) northwest of Mount Hampton, from which it is separated by a distinctive ice-covered saddle. Mapped by USGS from surveys and United States Navy aerial photographs, 1958–60. Named by the United States Advisory Committee on Antarctic Names (US-ACAN) for Captain Herbert Whitney, United States Navy Reserve, commander of the Navy's Mobile Construction Battalion responsible for the building of Antarctic stations for use during the International Geophysical Year. Whitney wintered over at Little America V in 1956.

=== Marks Peak ===
76°30′S 125°45′W. A rocky peak 3,325 metres (10,909 ft) high on the south side of the crater rim of Mount Hampton. Mapped by USGS from surveys and United States Navy trimetrogon photography, 1958-60. Named by US-ACAN for Keith E. Marks, electronics engineer, National Bureau of Standards, a member of the Marie Byrd Land Traverse Party, 1959–60.

== Mount Cumming ==
76°40′S 125°48′W. A low, mostly snow-covered mountain, volcanic in origin, located midway between Mount Hampton and Mount Hartigan. A circular snow-covered crater occupies the summit area. Discovered by the USAS (1939–41) on a flight, December 15, 1940, and named for Hugh S. Cumming, Jr., State Department member of the USAS Executive Committee. Mapped by USGS from surveys and United States Navy trimetrogon photography, 1958–60.

=== Annexstad Peak ===
76°41′S 125°52′W. A partially ice-free peak 2,610 metres (8,560 ft) high on the west side of the crater rim of Mount Cumming. Mapped by USGS from surveys and United States Navy trimetrogon photography, 1958–60. Named by US-ACAN for John O. Annexstad, geomagnetician and station seismologist at Byrd Station, 1958; later with the Meteorite Working Group, Johnson Space Center, Houston, Texas.

=== Le Vaux Peak ===
76°40′S 125°43′W. A small peak on the east side of the crater rim of Mount Cumming. Mapped by USGS from surveys and United States Navy aerial photographs, 1958-60. Named by US-ACAN for Howard A. Le Vaux, auroral physicist at Byrd Station, 1959, and a member of the Marie Byrd Land Traverse Party, 1959–60.

=== Woolam Peak ===
76°41′S 125°49′W. A small peak on the southern part of the crater rim of Mount Gumming. Mapped by USGS from surveys and United States Navy trimetrogon photography, 1958–60. Named by US-ACAN for Alvis E. Woolam, ionospheric physicist at Byrd Station, 1959.

== Mount Hartigan ==
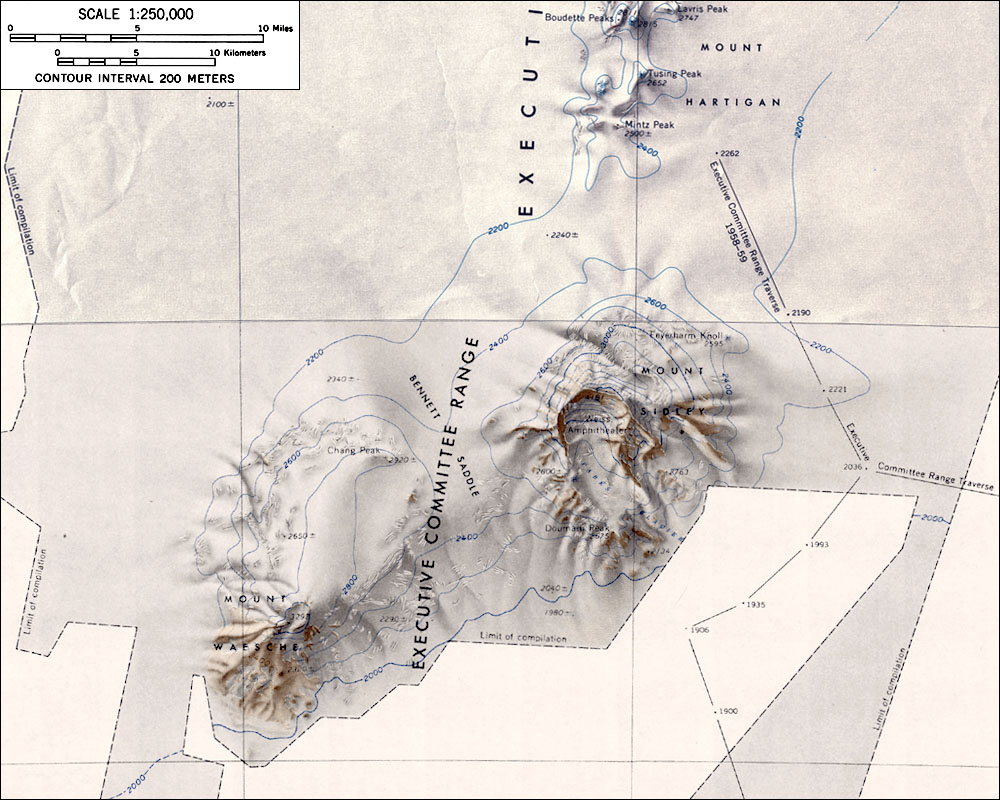
Topographic map of southern portion of Executive Committee Range

76°52′S 126°00′W. A broad, mostly snow-covered mountain with several individually named peaks which rise up to 2,800 metres (9,200 ft). It is immediately north of Mount Sidley. Discovered by the United States Antarctic Service expedition on a flight, December 15, 1940, and named for R. Admiral Charles C. Hartigan, United States Navy, Navy Department member of the Antarctic Service Executive Committee.

=== Lavris Peak ===
76°49′S 125°56′W. A snow-capped peak which rises to 2,745 metres (9,006 ft) in the northeast portion of Mount Hartigan. Mapped by USGS from surveys and United States Navy trimetrogon photography, 1958–60. Named by US-ACAN for William C. Lavris, Meteorological Technician at Byrd Station, 1959.

=== Boudette Peaks ===
76°50′S 126°02′W. Twin peaks 2,810 metres (9,220 ft) and 2,815 metres (9,236 ft) high located 1 nautical mile (1.9 km; 1.2 mi) west-southwest of Lavris Peak in the northern portion of Mount Hartigan. Mapped by USGS from surveys and United States Navy trimetrogon photography, 1958–60. Named by US-ACAN for Eugene L. Boudette, Geologist, USGS, a member of the Marie Byrd Land Traverse Party, 1959–60.

=== Tusing Peak ===
76°51′S 126°00′W. A snow-capped peak 2,650 metres (8,690 ft) high rising from the central portion of Mount Hartigan. Mapped by USGS from surveys and United States Navy trimetrogon photography, 1958–60, Named by US-ACAN for Alien D. Tusing, meteorologist at Byrd Station, 1959.

=== Mintz Peak ===
76°53′S 126°03′W. A small peak rising above the southeast corner of Mount Hartigan. Mapped by USGS from surveys and United States Navy trimetrogon photography, 1958–60. Named by US-ACAN for Jerome Mintz, Meteorological Electronics Technician at Byrd Station, 1959.

== Mount Sidley ==
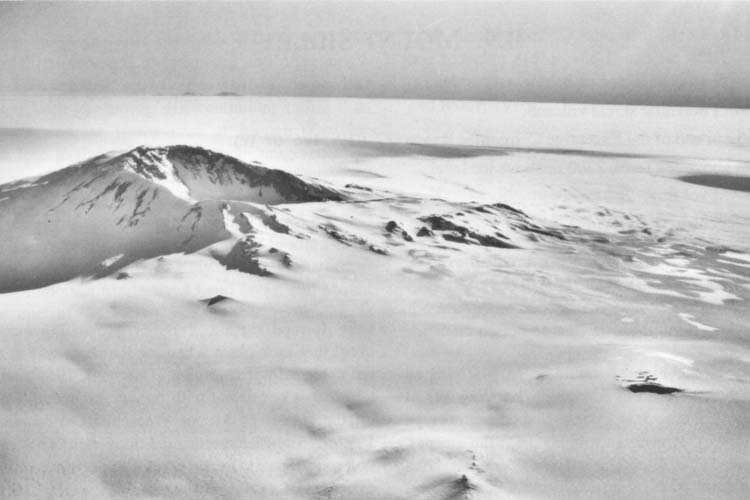
Mount Sidley caldera

77°02′S 126°06′W. A massive, mainly snow-covered mountain 4,285 metres (14,058 ft) high, which is the highest and most imposing of the five extinct volcanic mountains that comprise the Executive Committee Range. The feature is marked by a spectacular caldera on the southern side and stands northeast of Mount Waesche in the southern part of the range. Discovered by Rear Admiral Richard E. Byrd on an airplane flight, November 18, 1934, and named by him for Mabelle E. Sidley, the daughter of William Horlick, manufacturer, who was a contributor to the Byrd Antarctic Expedition, 1933–35.

=== Feyerharm Knoll ===
77°00′S 125°46′W. An ice-covered knoll on the lower northeastern slope of Mount Sidley. Surveyed by USGS during the Executive Committee Range Traverse of 1959. Named by US-ACAN for William R. Feyerharm, Meteorologist at Byrd Station, 1960.

=== Weiss Amphitheater ===
77°04′S 126°06′W. An amphitheater-like caldera, 2 nautical miles (3.7 km; 2.3 mi) wide and breached at the southern side, occupying the south-central part of Mount Sidley. Mapped by USGS from surveys and United States Navy trimetrogon photography, 1958–60. Named by US-ACAN for Bernard D. Weiss, Meteorologist-in-Charge at Byrd Station, 1959.

=== Parks Glacier ===
77°07′S 125°55′W. A glacier draining southeastward from Weiss Amphitheater. Mapped by USGS on the Executive Committee Range Traverse of 1959. Named by US-ACAN for Perry E. Parks, Jr., exploration geophysicist and assistant seismologist on the Marie Byrd Land Traverse, 1959–60.

=== Doumani Peak ===
77°07′S 126°03′W. A subsidiary peak 2,675 metres (8,776 ft) high on the southern slopes of Mount Sidley. Named by US-ACAN for George A. Doumani, Traverse Seismologist at Byrd Station, a member of the Executive Committee Range Traverse (February 1959) and Marie Byrd Land Traverse (1959–60) that carried out surveys of this area.

== Mount Waesche ==
77°10′S 126°54′W. A large and prominent mountain 3,290 metres (10,790 ft) high of volcanic origin, standing immediately southwest of Mount Sidley and marking the southern end of the Executive Committee Range. The feature is snow-covered except for rock exposures on the south and southwest slopes. Discovered by the United States Antarctic Service expedition on a flight, December 15, 1940. Named for V. Admiral Russell R. Waesche, United States Coast Guard, member of the Antarctic Service Executive Committee.

=== Bennett Saddle ===
77°05′S 126°26′W. The deep snow saddle between Mount Waesche and Mount Sidley. Named by US-ACAN for Gerard A. Bennett, Traverse Specialist at Byrd Station, a member of the Executive Committee Range Traverse (February 1959) and Marie Byrd Land Traverse (1959–60) that carried out surveys in this area.

=== Chang Peak ===
77°04′S 126°38′W. A snow-covered subsidiary peak 2,920 metres (9,580 ft) high on the northeastern slope of Mount Waesche. Mapped by USGS from surveys and United States Navy trimetrogon photography, 1958–60. Named by US-ACAN for Feng-Keng (Frank) Chang, Traverse Seismologist at Byrd Station, 1959, and a member of the Marie Byrd Land Traverse Party that explored this area, 1959–60.

== Sources ==
- Alberts, Fred G., ed. (1995), Geographic Names of the Antarctic (PDF) (2 ed.), United States Board on Geographic Names This article incorporates public domain material from websites or documents of the United States Board on Geographic Names.
- Lough, A.; Wiens, D.; Barcheck, C.; Aster, R.; Nyblade, A.; Huerta, A.; Wilson, T. (2013), "Seismic detection of an active subglacial volcanic center in Marie Byrd Land, Antarctica", Nature Geoscience, doi:10.1038/ngeo1992
- Mount Hampton, USGS: United States Geological Survey
- Mount Sidley, USGS: United States Geological Survey
- This article incorporates public domain material from websites or documents of the United States Geological Survey.
