= Slime =

Slime or slimy may refer to:

== Science and technology ==
=== Biology ===
- Slime coat, the coating of mucus covering the body of all fish
- Slime mold, an informal name for several eukaryotic organisms
- Biofilm, or slime, a syntrophic community of microorganisms in which cells stick to each other
- Slimy (fish), also known as the ponyfish
- Snail slime, the mucus produced by snails
- Subsurface lithoautotrophic microbial ecosystem, or SLiMEs, a type of endolithic ecosystems

=== Chemistry ===
- Gunge, or slime, a thick, gooey, yet runny substance used in children's TV programmes
- Flubber (material), a rubbery polymer commonly called slime
- Tailings, or slimes, a waste material left after the process of separation of ores

=== Computing ===
- SLIME (Superior Lisp Interaction Mode for Emacs), an Emacs mode for developing Common Lisp applications

== Arts and entertainment ==
=== Toys ===
- Slime (toy), a viscous, oozing green material
- Slime (homemade toy), a viscous material which is made as a toy

=== Characters ===
- Slime (monster), a type of creature in fantasy media
- Slime (Dragon Quest), a species of monster in the game franchise
- Slimey the Worm, pet of Oscar the Grouch in Sesame Street

=== Music ===
- Slime (band), a German punk rock band 1979–1994
- Slime (musician) (Wilma Archer, born 1991), English record producer and multi-instrumentalist

=== Literature ===
- "Slime", or "Mire", a short story by Anton Chekhov
- "Slime", a 1953 novelette by Joseph Payne Brennan

=== Video games ===
- Slime (series), a series of games from Dragon Quest
- Slime (video game), 1982

=== Film ===
- Slime (film), an American animated film

== Other uses ==
- Slime, Croatia, a village near Omiš

== See also ==
- Blob (disambiguation)
- Green slime (disambiguation)
- Pink slime (disambiguation)
- Oobleck (disambiguation)
- Slimer, a green ghost in Ghostbusters
- Slime ball (disambiguation)
- Sliime, British rapper
