= Cape Dart =

Cape in Marie Byrd Land, Antarctica

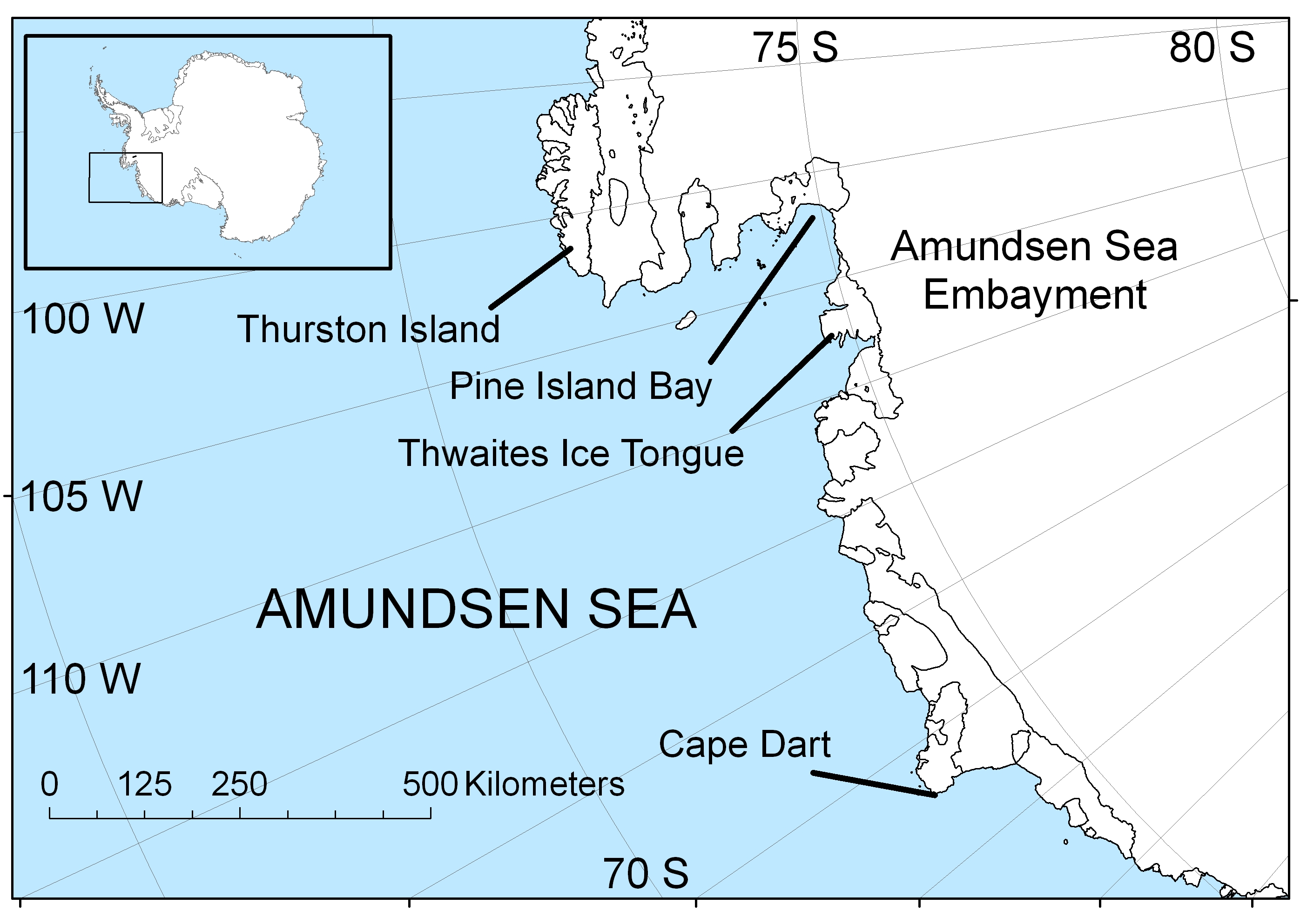
Cape Dart marks the western limit of the Amundsen Sea

Cape Dart (73°7′S 126°9′W) is a cape at the foot of Mount Siple on the north coast of Siple Island, just southward of Lauff Island off the Bakutis Coast, Marie Byrd Land. It was discovered in December 1940 by members of the United States Antarctic Service in a flight from West Base, and was named for Justin Whitlock Dart who, as an executive of the Walgreen Drug Co, supported the expedition. The average temperature at Cape Dart is around -50°F.
