= Pankratz Bay =

Bay in Antarctica

Pankratz Bay (73°27′S 126°38′W) is a bay in the western end of Siple Island, off the coast of Marie Byrd Land. The bay is just south of Lovill Bluff and opens on Wrigley Gulf. Mapped by United States Geological Survey (USGS) from surveys and U.S. Navy aerial photography, 1959–65. Named by Advisory Committee on Antarctic Names (US-ACAN) for Leroy M. Pankratz, United States Antarctic Research Program (USARP) geomagnetician and seismologist at Byrd Station in 1965.
