= Lovill Bluff =

Rock and snow bluff on Siple Island, Antarctica

Lovill Bluff (73°22′S 126°54′W) is a rock and snow coastal bluff at the western end of Siple Island, off the coast of Marie Byrd Land, Antarctica. The bluff stands 14 nautical miles (26 km) southwest of the summit of Mount Siple and marks the north side of the entrance to Pankratz Bay. It was mapped by United States Geological Survey from surveys and U.S. Navy air photos, 1959–65, and was named by the Advisory Committee on Antarctic Names for James E. Lovill, the United States Antarctic Research Program meteorologist-in-charge at Byrd Station in 1965.
