= Siple =

- Allen Siple (1900–1973), American architect
- Paul Siple (1908–1968), American Antarctic explorer
- Siple Island, an island in Wrigley Gulf
- Mount Siple, a volcano in Siple Island
- Siple Coast, a coast in Ross Ice Shelf
- Siple Station, an Antarctic station, established in 1973
- Siple Ridge, a high ridge, in the Quartermain Mountains, Victoria Land
- Siple Dome, an ice dome east of Siple Coast in Antarctica
- Siple-Passel equation, a way to calculate Wind chill factor
