= Mathewson Point =

Headland of Antarctica

Coordinates: 74°23′S 132°33′W

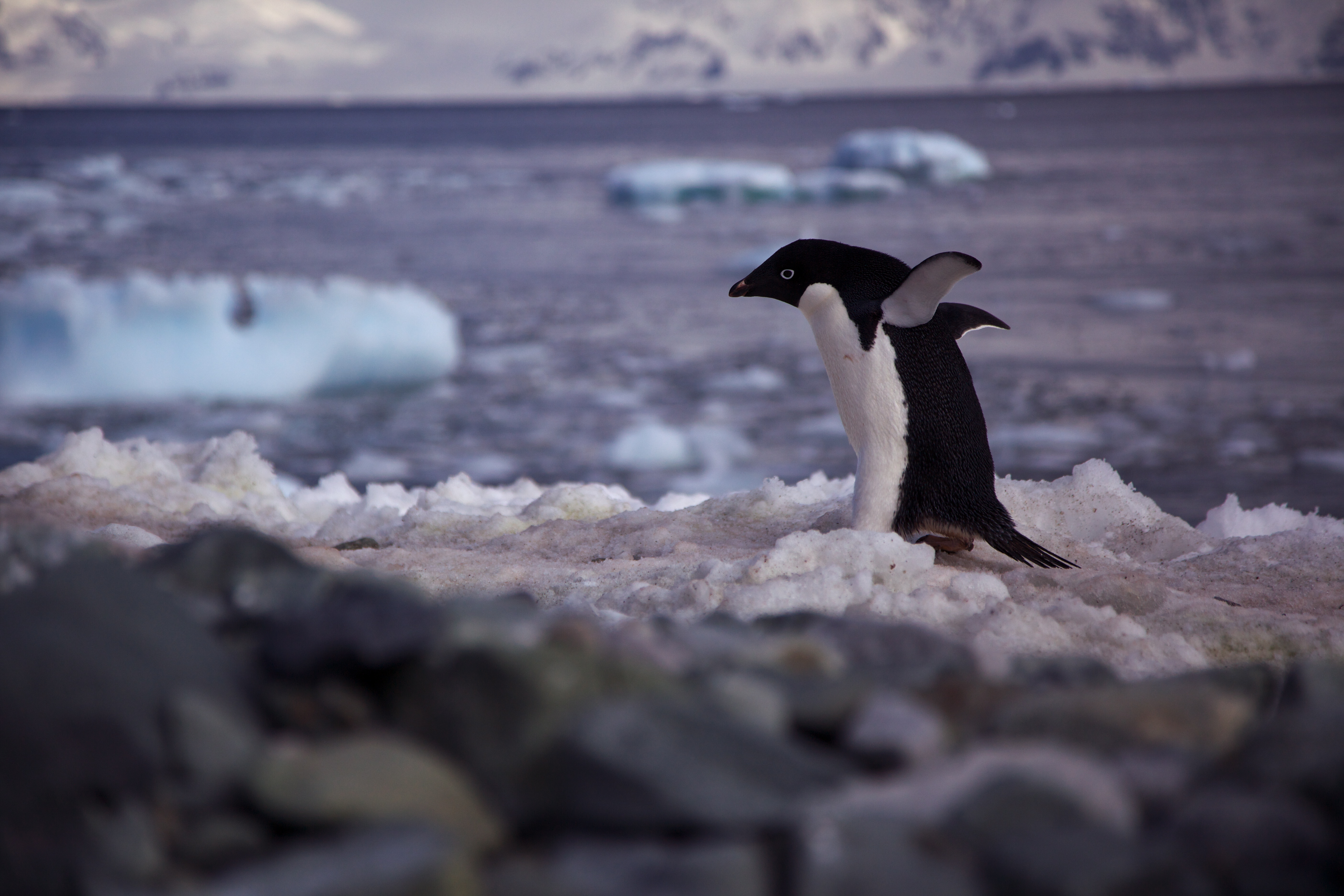
Adélie penguins breed in the IBA

Mathewson Point is a steep, rocky point at the northern tip of Shepard Island, which lies on the seaward edge of the Getz Ice Shelf in Marie Byrd Land, Antarctica. The point, the site of an Adélie penguin rookery, was charted by personnel of USS Glacier on February 4, 1962, and was named by the Advisory Committee on Antarctic Names for Lieutenant David S. Mathewson, U.S. Navy, then supply officer of Glacier.

== Important Bird Area ==
An 80-hectare (200-acre) site comprising all the ice-free ground at the point has been designated an Important Bird Area (IBA) by BirdLife International because it supports about 29,000 breeding pairs of Adélie penguins, as estimated by 2010 satellite imagery.
