= Lauff Island =

Island in Marie Byrd Land, Antarctica

- Location within Antarctica

Geography
- Location: Antarctica
- Coordinates: 73°3′S 126°8′W

Administration
- Administered under the Antarctic Treaty System

Demographics
- Population: Uninhabited

Lauff Island is a small island lying 4 kilometres (2 nmi) north of Cape Dart, Siple Island, off the Bakutis Coast of Marie Byrd Land, Antarctica. Like its neighbor Maher Island, Lauff Island is a tuff cone. It was discovered and photographed from aircraft of U.S. Navy Operation Highjump, 1946–47, and was named by the Advisory Committee on Antarctic Names for Commander Bernard J. Lauff, U.S. Navy, commanding officer of USS Glacier (AGB-4) during Operation Deep Freeze, 1956–57.

== See also ==
- List of Antarctic and sub-Antarctic islands
