= Bowyer Butte =

Butte in Antarctica

- Location within Antarctica

Highest point
- Coordinates: 74°59′S 134°45′W

Geography
- Continent: Antarctica
- Region: Marie Byrd Land

Bowyer Butte (74°59′S 134°45′W) is a steep-cliffed eminence with a nearly flat summit, 3 nautical miles (5.6 km; 3.5 mi) wide and 1,085 metres (3,560 ft) high, located between the lower ends of the Johnson Glacier and the Venzke Glacier on the coast of Marie Byrd Land, Antarctica.

== Location ==
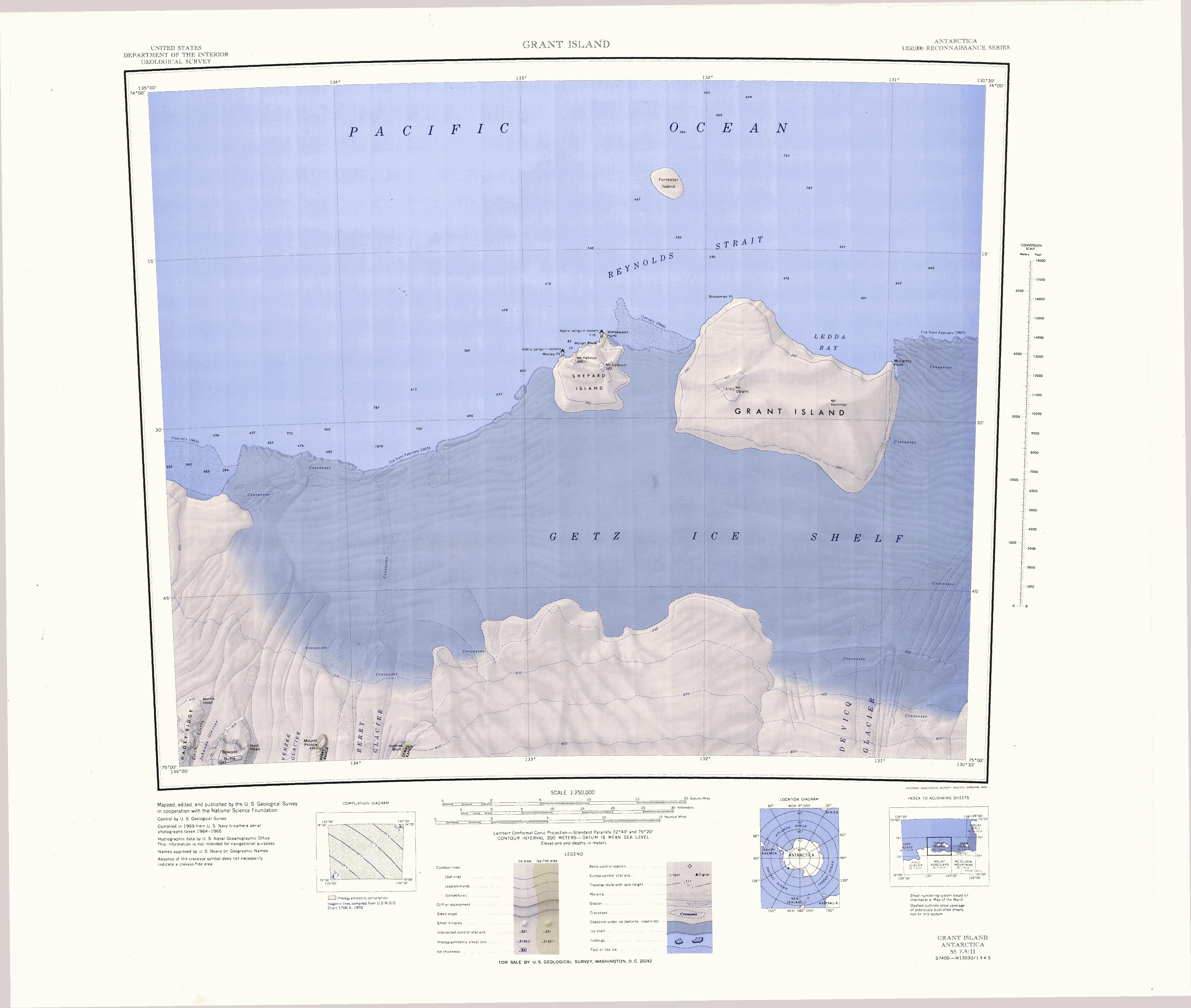
Bowyer Butte in extreme southwest of map

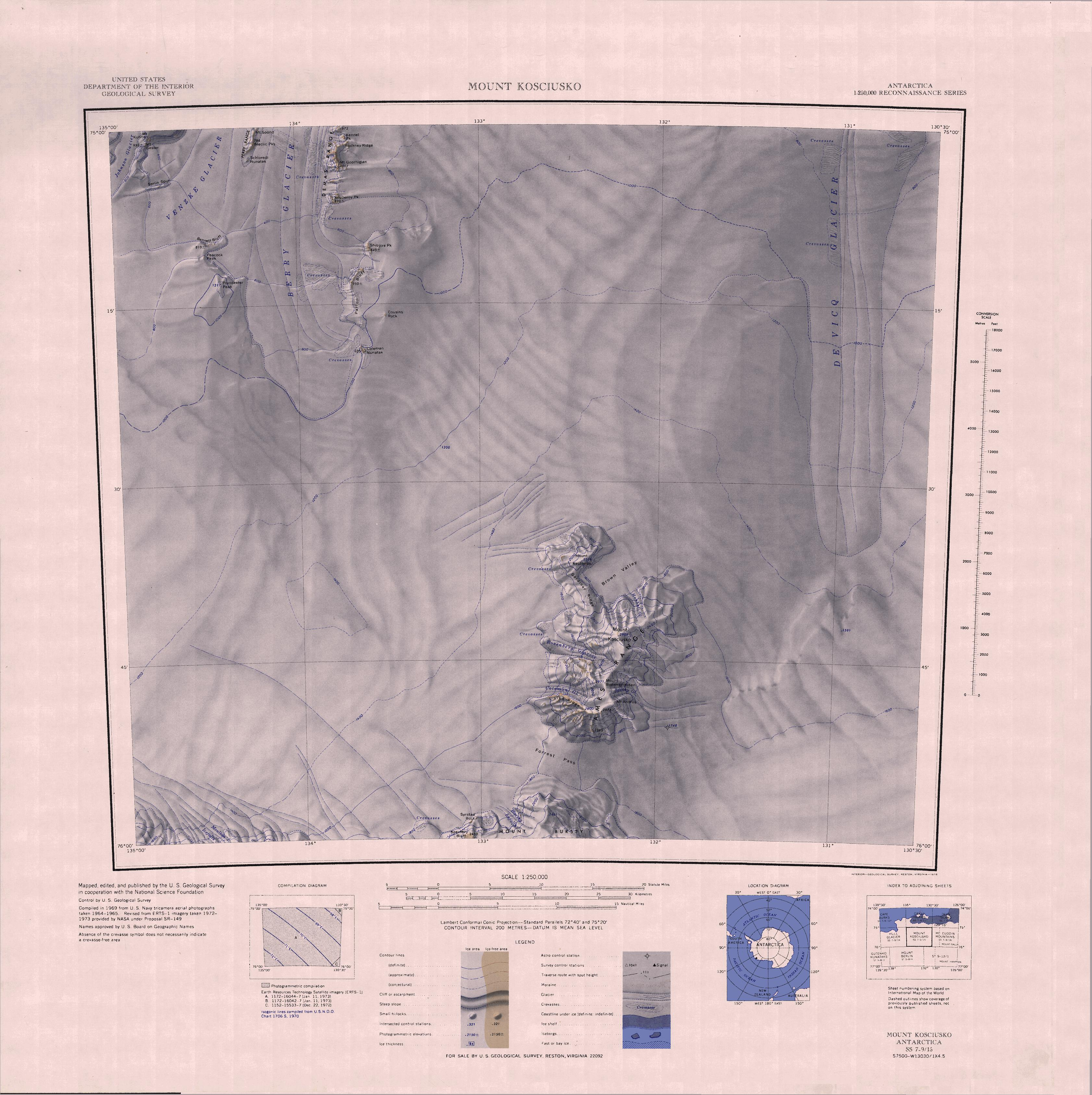
Bowyer Butte in extreme northwest of map

Bowyer Butte is south of the Getz Ice Shelf. To its west, the Johnson Glacier separates it from Hagey Ridge. To its east, the Venzke Glacier separates it from the Perry Range. Features and nearby features include, from north to south, Hoyt Head, Mount Kohnen, Mount Gester and Serlin Spur.

== Discovery and name ==
Bowyer Butte was discovered and photographed from the air by the United States Antarctic Service (USAS), 1939–41. It was named by the United States Advisory Committee on Antarctic Names (US-ACAN) for Donald W. Bowyer, a United States Antarctic Research Program meteorologist at Byrd Station in 1962.

== Features ==
=== Hoyt Head ===
74°59′S 134°36′W. High rock headland forming the northeast end of Bowyer Butte, located at the west side of Venzke Glacier. The headland was first seen and photographed from aircraft of the United States Antarctic Service in December 1940. It was mapped by the United States Geological Survey (USGS) from surveys and United States Navy air photos, 1959-66. It was named by US-ACAN for Lieutenant Ronnie A. Hoyt, CEC, United States Navy Reserve, Officer-inCharge at Byrd Station, 1971.

=== Mount Kohnen ===
75°00′S 134°47′W. A peak on the southwest corner of Bowyer Butte. Mapped by USGS from surveys and United States Navy air photos, 1959-65. Named by US-ACAN for Heinz Kohnen, geophysicist at Byrd Station, 1970-71.

=== Mount Gester ===
75°01′S 134°48′W. A flat-topped, ice-capped mountain 950 metres (3,120 ft) high on the divide between Johnson Glacier and Venzke Glacier. It stands just south of Mount Kohnen and Bowyer Butte. Mapped by USGS from surveys and United States Navy air photos, 1959-65. Named by US-ACAN for Lieutenant (j.g.) Ronald L. Gester, NOAA Corps, seismologist/geomagnetist at Byrd Station, 1971.

=== Serlin Spur ===
75°04′S 134°42′W. A narrow, mostly snow-covered spur 4 nautical miles (7.4 km; 4.6 mi) south of Bowyer Butte. The spur extends eastward from the divide between Johnson and Venzke Glaciers and intrudes into the upper part of the latter glacier. Mapped by USGS from surveys and United States Navy air photos, 1959-65. Named by US-ACAN for Ronald C. Serlin, ionospheric physicist at Siple Station, 1969-70.

== Sources ==
- Alberts, Fred G., ed. (1995), Geographic Names of the Antarctic (PDF) (2 ed.), United States Board on Geographic Names This article incorporates public domain material from websites or documents of the United States Board on Geographic Names.
- Grant Island, USGS: United States Geological Survey
- Mount Kosciusco, USGS: United States Geological Survey
- This article incorporates public domain material from websites or documents of the United States Geological Survey.
