= Carney Island =

Island in Marie Byrd Land, Antarctica

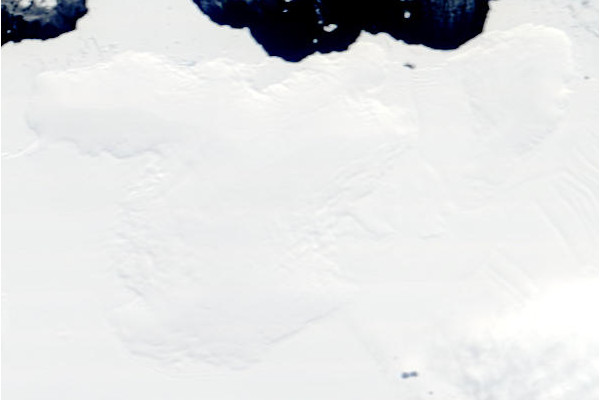
- October 2002 satellite photograph of the Carney Island

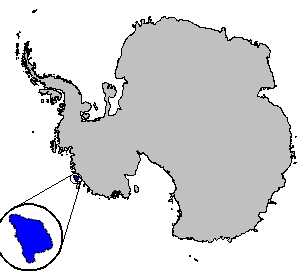
- Location of Carney Island in Antarctica

Geography
- Location: Antarctica
- Coordinates: 73°57′S 121°00′W
- Area: 8,500 km^{2} (3,300 sq mi)
- Length: 110 km (68 mi)

Demographics
- Population: 0 (2023)

Carney Island (73°57′S 121°00′W) is an ice-covered island, 70 nautical miles (130 km; 81 mi) long with all but its north coast lying within the Getz Ice Shelf, Antarctica. It is located between Siple Island and Wright Island along the coast of Marie Byrd Land.

== Name ==
Carney Island was first delineated (except for its south part) from aerial photographs taken by United States Navy Operation Highjump (OpHjp) in January 1947. It was named by the United States Advisory Committee on Antarctic Names (US-ACAN) after Admiral Robert Carney (1895–1990), Chief of Naval Operations during the organization of Operation Deep Freeze support for the International Geophysical Year (IGY) of 1957–1958.

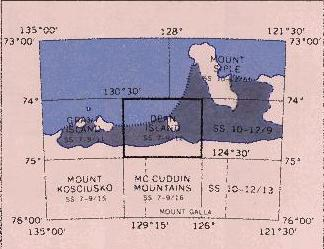
Western Getz Ice Shelf, Shepard Island to Carney island

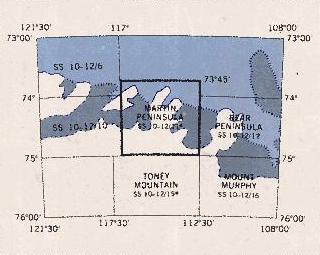
Eastern Getz Ice Shelf, Carney Island to Martin Peninsula

== Features ==
=== Cape Gates ===
73°35′S 122°38′W. An ice-covered cape which marks the northwest extremity of Carney Island along the coast of Marie Byrd Land. First mapped by the United States Geological Survey (USGS) from aerial photographs taken by United States Navy OpHjp in January 1947. Named by US-ACAN for Thomas S. Gates, Under Secretary of the Navy before and during the Navy's Deep Freeze expeditions.

=== Ramage Point ===
73°39′S 120°20′W. An ice-covered point lying just west of Beakley Glacier on the north side of Carney Island, along the coast of Marie Byrd Land. Delineated from aerial photographs taken by United States Navy OpHjp in January 1947. Named by US-ACAN for R. Admiral L.P. Ramage, United States Navy, Assistant Chief of Naval Operations, Ships Operations and Readiness, in the post 1957-58 IGY period.

=== Beakley Glacier ===
73°51′S 119°50′W. A glacier on the west side of Duncan Peninsula on Carney Island, flowing north into Amundsen Sea. Delineated by USGS from aerial photos taken by United States Navy OpHjp in January 1947. Named by US-ACAN for V. Admiral W.M. Beakley, United States Navy, Deputy Chief of Naval Operations for Ship Operations and Readiness during the IGY period, 1957-58.

=== Cape Leahy ===
73°43′S 119°00′W. An ice-covered cape which marks the north extremity of Duncan Peninsula, Carney Island. Discovered and photographed from the air on January 24, 1947, by United States Navy Operation Highjump, 1946-47. Named by R. Adm. Byrd for Fleet Admiral William D. Leahy, United States Navy, who, as naval advisor to the President at the time of Operation Highjump, assisted materially at the high-level planning and authorization stages.

=== Duncan Peninsula ===
73°56′S 119°30′W. An ice-covered peninsula, 30 nautical miles (56 km; 35 mi) long, which forms the east part of Carney Island. Delineated from aerial photographs taken by United States Navy OpHjp in January 1947. Named by US-ACAN for Admiral Donald B. Duncan, United States Navy (Ret.), Vice Chief of Naval Operations under Admiral Carney during the IGY period of 1957-58.

== Sources ==
- Alberts, Fred G., ed. (1995), Geographic Names of the Antarctic (PDF) (2 ed.), United States Board on Geographic Names This article incorporates public domain material from websites or documents of the United States Board on Geographic Names.
- This article incorporates public domain material from websites or documents of the United States Geological Survey.
