= Sipple (disambiguation) =

Oliver Sipple (1941–1989) was an American soldier and activist.

Sipple may also refer to:

- Donald Sipple (fl. 1990s), American political worker & subject of an expose edited by Jeff Klein and written by Richard Bradley
- Sipple, fictional character in Arthur television series
- Sipple Avenue, in Fullerton, Baltimore County, Maryland
- Sipple Farm, located on Sipple Avenue in Fullerton, Baltimore County, Maryland
- Sipple House, a historic home located at Leipsic, Kent County, Delaware

== See also ==
- For Sipple syndrome see Multiple endocrine neoplasia type 2
- Siple (disambiguation)
