= Plob =

Plob may refer to:

- Plob, an organization from the Nintendo DS game Dragon Quest Heroes: Rocket Slime
- Petty Little Odious Bid (PLOB), a term for the New Minor Forcing convention in the card game contract bridge
- Friedrich Plöb, see: Odilo Globocnik

== See also ==
- Blob (disambiguation)
