= Armour Peninsula =

Peninsula near Antarctica

Armour Peninsula (73°42′S 124°10′W) is an ice-covered peninsula situated immediately east of Armour Inlet on Siple Island, along the coast of Marie Byrd Land. It was mapped by the United States Geological Survey from ground surveys and from U.S. Navy air photos, 1959–65, and named by the Advisory Committee on Antarctic Names in association with Armour Inlet.
