= Petinos =

Petinos is a Greek surname. Notable people with the surname include:

- Eleni Petinos (born 1985/86), Australian politician
- Helen Petinos (born 1993), Australian footballer

== See also ==
- Mount Petinos, in Antarctica
