= The Blob (Antarctica) =

The Blob (73°24′S 124°56′W) is a fairly conspicuous, mound-shaped knoll that is almost completely snow-covered, standing midway between Thurston Glacier and Armour Inlet on the north coast of Siple Island. This feature was first plotted by United States Geological Survey (USGS) from air photos taken by U.S. Navy Operation Highjump in January 1947. The descriptive name was suggested by a member of the Advisory Committee on Antarctic Names (US-ACAN) staff on the basis of the appearance of the feature in the aerial photographs.
