= Thurston Glacier =

Glacier of Antarctica

Coordinates: 73°18′S 125°18′W

Location in Antarctica

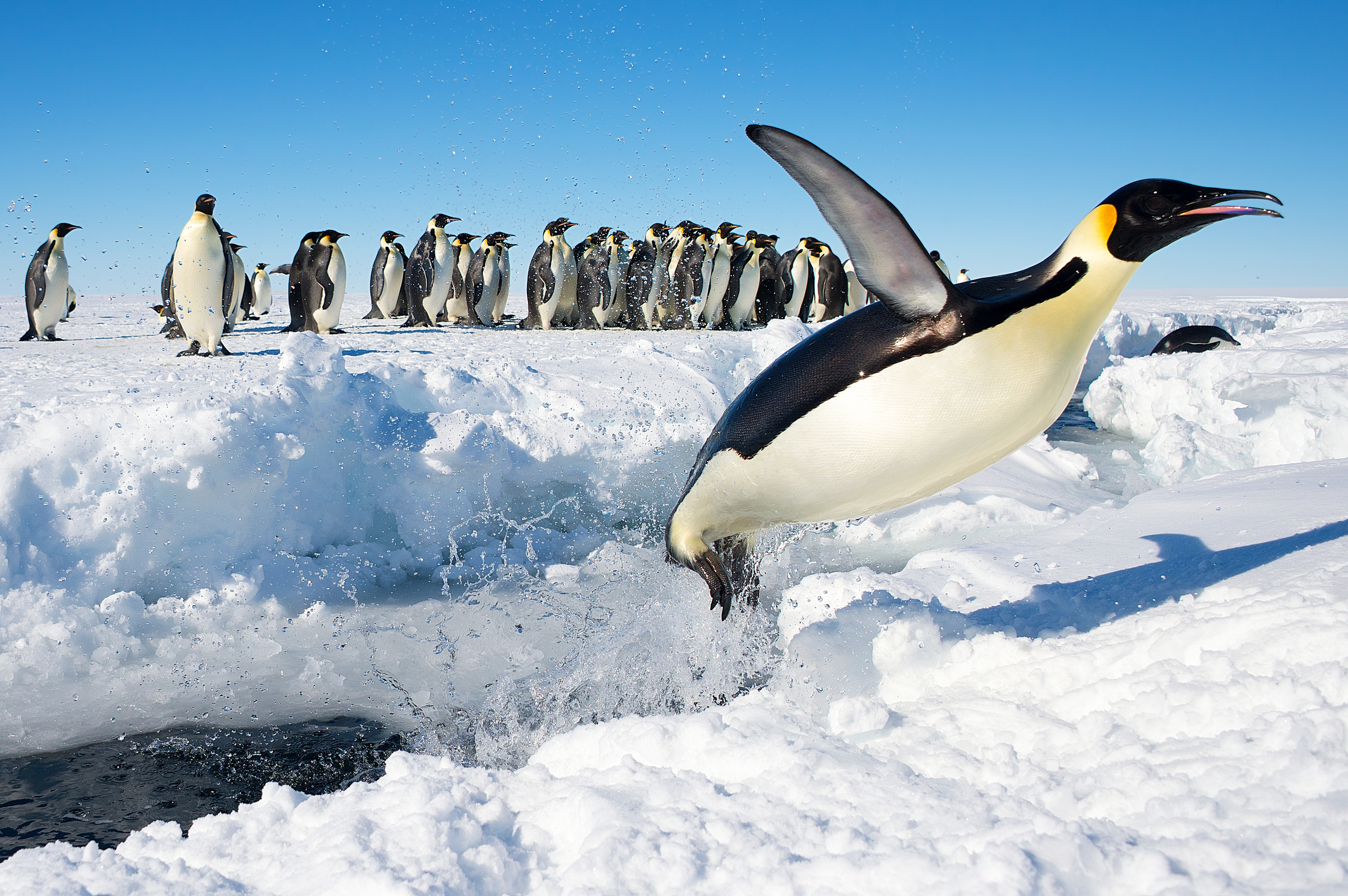
Emperor penguins breed in the IBA

Thurston Glacier is a glacier about 28 km (17 mi) long which drains the south-eastern slopes of Mount Siple on Siple Island. The glacier trends eastward and then east-north-eastward to reach the northern shore of the island. It was mapped by the United States Geological Survey (USGS) from surveys and United States Navy aerial photography, 1959–65.

== Discovery and naming ==
The glacier was named by the Advisory Committee on Antarctic Names (US-ACAN) for Thomas R. Thurston, a United States Antarctic Research Program (USARP) meteorologist at Byrd Station in 1965.

== Important Bird Area ==
A 293 ha site, comprising the marine area and fast ice that forms near the terminus of the glacier, has been designated an Important Bird Area (IBA) by BirdLife International because it supports a breeding colony of about 3,000 emperor penguins, estimated from 2009 satellite imagery.
