= Endolith =

Organism living inside a rock

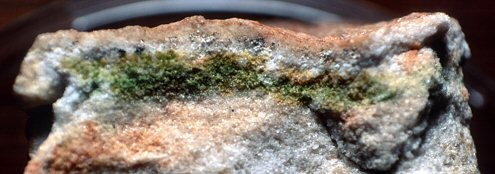
Endolith lifeform found inside an Antarctic rock

An endolith or endolithic is an organism (archaeon, bacterium, fungus, lichen, algae, sponge, or amoeba) that is able to acquire the necessary resources for growth in the inner part of a rock, mineral, coral, animal shells, or in the pores between mineral grains of a rock. Many are extremophiles, living in places long considered inhospitable to life. The distribution, biomass, and diversity of endolith microorganisms are determined by the physical and chemical properties of the rock substrate, including the mineral composition, permeability, the presence of organic compounds, the structure and distribution of pores, water retention capacity, and the pH. Normally, the endoliths colonize the areas within lithic substrates to withstand intense solar radiation, temperature fluctuations, wind, and desiccation. They are of particular interest to astrobiologists, who theorize that endolithic environments on Mars and other planets constitute potential refugia for extraterrestrial microbial communities.

== Subdefinitions ==
The term "endolith", which defines an organism that colonizes the interior of any kind of rock, has been further classified into five subclasses:

Chasmoendolith
Colonizes fissures and cracks in the rock connected to the surface (chasm = cleft)
Cryptoendolith
Colonizes structural cavities within natural pore spaces within the rocks. These pores are usually indirectly connected to the rock surface; (crypto = hidden)
Euendolith
Penetrates actively into the interior of rocks forming channels and grooves that conform with the shape of its body, rock boring organism (eu = true)
Hypoendolith
Colonizes the pore spaces located on the underside of the rock and that make contact with the soil (hypo = under)
Autoendolith
Capable of rocks formation by mineral depositation (auto = self)

== Environment ==
Endolithic microorganisms have been reported in many areas around the globe. There are reports in warm hyper-arid and arid deserts such as Mojave and Sonora (USA), Atacama (Chile), Gobi (China, Mongolia), Negev (Israel), Namib (Namibia Angola), Al-Jafr basin (Jordan) and the Depression of Turpan (China), also in cold deserts as Arctic and Antarctic, and deep subsoil and ocean trenches rocks. However, there are reports of endolithic microorganisms in inter-tropical zones, where humidity and solar radiation are significantly different from the above-mentioned biomes. Endoliths have been found in the rock down to a depth of 3 km (1.9 mi), though it is unknown if that is their limit (due to the cost involved in drilling to such depths). The main threat to their survival seems not to result from the pressure at such depth, but from the increased temperature. Judging from hyperthermophile organisms, the temperature limit is at about 120 °C (Strain 121 can reproduce at 121 °C), which limits the possible depth to 4-4.5 km below the continental crust, and 7 or 7.5 km below the ocean floor. Endolithic organisms have also been found in surface rocks in regions of low humidity (hypolith) and low temperature (psychrophile), including the Dry Valleys and permafrost of Antarctica, the Alps, and the Rocky Mountains.

== Metabolism and survival ==
The metabolism of endolithic microorganisms is versatile; genes involved in sulphur metabolism, iron metabolism and carbon fixation have been found in many endolithic communities. Whether they metabolize directly from the surrounding rock, or excrete an acid to dissolve it first is yet undetermined. According to Meslier & DiRuggiero there are genes found in the endolithic community involved in nitrogen fixation. The Ocean Drilling Program found microscopic trails in basalt from the Atlantic, Indian, and Pacific oceans that contain DNA. Photosynthetic endoliths have also been discovered.

As water and nutrients are sparse in the endolith's surrounding environment, water limitation is a key factor in the capacity of survival of many endolithic microorganisms. Many of those microorganisms have adaptations to survive in low concentrations of water. Additionally, pigments such as beta carotenes and chlorophyll, especially in cyanobacteria and some algae, help to protect against dangerous radiation and act as a way to obtain energy. Another characteristic is the presence of a very slow reproduction cycle. Early data suggest some only engage in cell division once every hundred years. In August 2013, researchers reported evidence of endoliths in the ocean floor, perhaps millions of years old and reproducing only once every 10,000 years. Most of their energy is spent repairing cell damage caused by cosmic rays or racemization, and very little is available for reproduction or growth. It is thought that they weather long ice ages in this fashion, emerging when the temperature in the area warms.

== Ecology ==
As most endoliths are autotrophs, they can generate organic compounds essential for their survival on their own from inorganic matter. Some endoliths have specialized in feeding on their autotroph relatives. The micro-biotope where these different endolithic species live together has been called a subsurface lithoautotrophic microbial ecosystem (SLiME), or endolithic systems within the subterranean lithic biome.

Endolithic systems are still at an early stage of exploration. In some cases its biota can support simple invertebrates, most organisms are unicellular. Near-surface layers of rock may contain blue-green algae but most energy comes from chemical synthesis of minerals. The limited supply of energy limits the rates of growth and reproduction. In deeper rock layers microbes are exposed to high pressures and temperatures.

== Endolithic fungi and algae in marine ecosystems ==
Although it is possible that endolithic fungi could play an important role in the health of coral reefs, only limited research has been conducted on the distribution and diversity of marine endolithic fungi.

Endolithic fungi have been discovered in shells as early as the year 1889 by Edouard Bornet and Charles Flahault. These two French phycologists specifically provided descriptions for two fungi: Ostracoblabe implexis and Lithopythium gangliiforme. Discovery of endolithic fungi, such as Dodgella priscus and Conchyliastrum, has also been made in the beach sand of Australia by George Zembrowski. Findings have also been made in coral reefs and have been found to be, at times, beneficial to their coral hosts.

In the wake of worldwide coral bleaching, studies have suggested that the endolithic algae located in the skeleton of the coral may be aiding the survival of coral species by providing an alternative source of energy. Although the role that endolithic fungi play is important in coral reefs, it is often overlooked because much research is focused on the effects of coral bleaching as well as the relationships between Coelenterate and endosymbiotic Symbiodinia.

According to a study done by Astrid Gunther endoliths were also found in the island of Cozumel (Mexico). The endoliths found there not only included algae and fungi but also included cyanobacteria, sponges as well as many other microborers.

== Endolithic parasitism ==
Until the 1990s phototrophic endoliths were thought of as somewhat benign, but evidence has since surfaced that phototrophic endoliths (primarily cyanobacteria) have infested 50 to 80% of midshore populations of the mussel species Perna perna located in South Africa. The infestation of phototrophic endoliths resulted in lethal and sub-lethal effects such as the decrease in strength of the mussel shells. Although the rate of thickening of the shells were faster in more infested areas it is not rapid enough to combat the degradation of the mussel shells.

== Endolithic fungi found in the eggs of Cretaceous dinosaurs ==
Evidence of endolithic fungi were discovered within dinosaur eggshell found in central China. They were characterized as being “needle-like, ribbon-like, and silk-like.".

Fungus is seldom fossilized and even when it is preserved it can be difficult to distinguish endolithic hyphae from endolithic cyanobacteria and algae. Endolithic microbes can, however, be distinguished based on their distribution, ecology, and morphology. According to a 2008 study, the endolithic fungi that formed on the eggshells would have resulted in the abnormal incubation of the eggs and may have killed the embryos in infected eggs of these dinosaurs. It may also have led to the preservation of dinosaur eggs, including some that contained embryos.

== Relationship with astrobiology ==
Endolithic microorganisms have been considered a model for the search for life on other planets by inquiring about what sort of microorganisms on Earth inhabit specific minerals, which helps to propose those lithologies as life detection targets on an extra-terrestrial surface such as Mars. Several studies have been carried out in extreme places that serve as analogs for Mars's surface and subsurface, and many studies in geomicrobiology on Earth's hot and cold deserts have been developed. In these extreme environments, microorganisms find protection against thermal buffering, UV radiation, and desiccation while living inside pores and fissures of minerals and rocks. Life in these endolithic habitats might face similar stress due to the scarcity of water and high UV radiation that rule on modern Mars.

An excellent example of these adaptations is the non-hygroscopic but microporous translucent gypsum crusts, which are found as potential substrates that can mitigate exposure to UV radiation and desiccation and allow microbial colonization in hyper-arid deserts. In the same way, the ability to grow under high water stress and oligotrophic conditions confer to endolithic microorganisms to survive in conditions similar to those found on Mars. There is evidence of the past existence of water on the red planet; perhaps, these microorganisms could develop adaptations found in current deserts on the Earth. Furthermore, The endolithic structures are a good way to find ancient or current biological activity (biosignatures) on Mars or other rocky planets.

== Geological evidence ==
In 2025, researchers from Johannes Gutenberg University Mainz reported unusual micro-burrows discovered in marble and limestone formations across desert regions of Namibia, Oman, and Saudi Arabia. These micro-tunnels, roughly half a millimeter wide and up to three centimeters long, were aligned vertically in parallel bands and filled with calcium carbonate powder. Traces of biological material suggest these features were formed by a previously unknown endolithic microorganism capable of penetrating deep into rock, likely to access nutrients. While no DNA was recovered, the structures are estimated to be between one and two million years old and represent possible subfossil evidence of microbial life.

== See also ==
- Lithophile
- Lithotroph
- Volyn biota
- Living entombed animal
