= Slime ball =

A slime ball or slimeball may refer to:

- The medium of transmission for Dicrocoelium dendriticum, the lancet liver fluke
- Slimeballs, a book series
- Slimeball, a mixtape series by Young Nudy

== See also ==
- Slime (disambiguation)
