= Grant Island =

Island in Marie Byrd Land, Antarctica

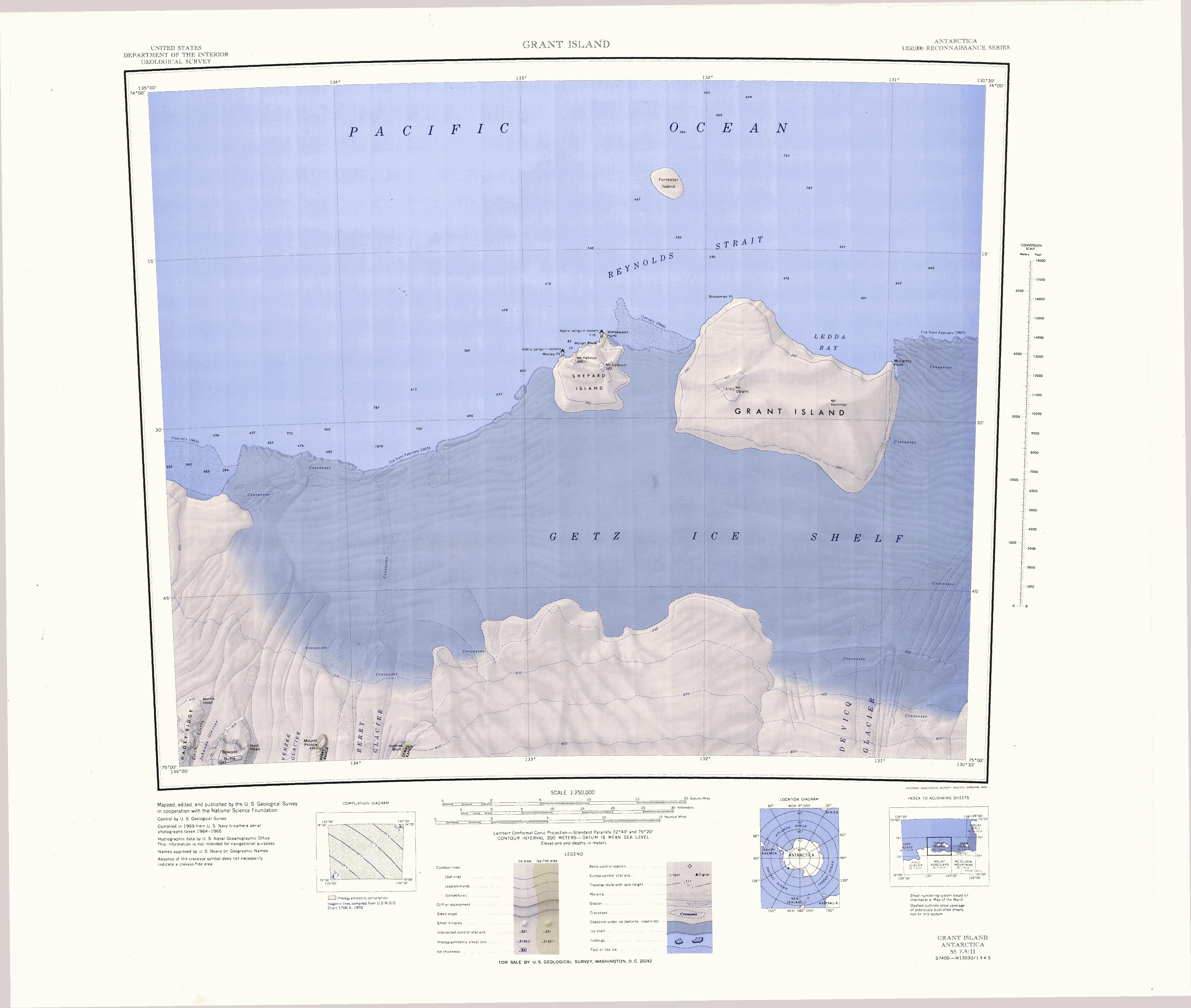
- Map of Grant Island

- Location within Antarctica

Geography
- Location: Antarctica
- Coordinates: 74°28′S 131°35′W
- Area: 703 km^{2} (271 sq mi)
- Length: 37 km (23 mi)
- Width: 19 km (11.8 mi)

Administration
- Administered under the Antarctic Treaty System

Demographics
- Population: Uninhabited

Grant Island (74°28′S 131°35′W) is an ice-covered island, 20 nautical miles (37 km; 23 mi) long and 10 nautical miles (19 km; 12 mi) wide, lying 5 nautical miles (9.3 km; 5.8 mi) east of the smaller Shepard Island off the coast of Marie Byrd Land, Antarctica. Like Shepard Island, Grant Island is surrounded by the Getz Ice Shelf on all but the north side.

== Location ==
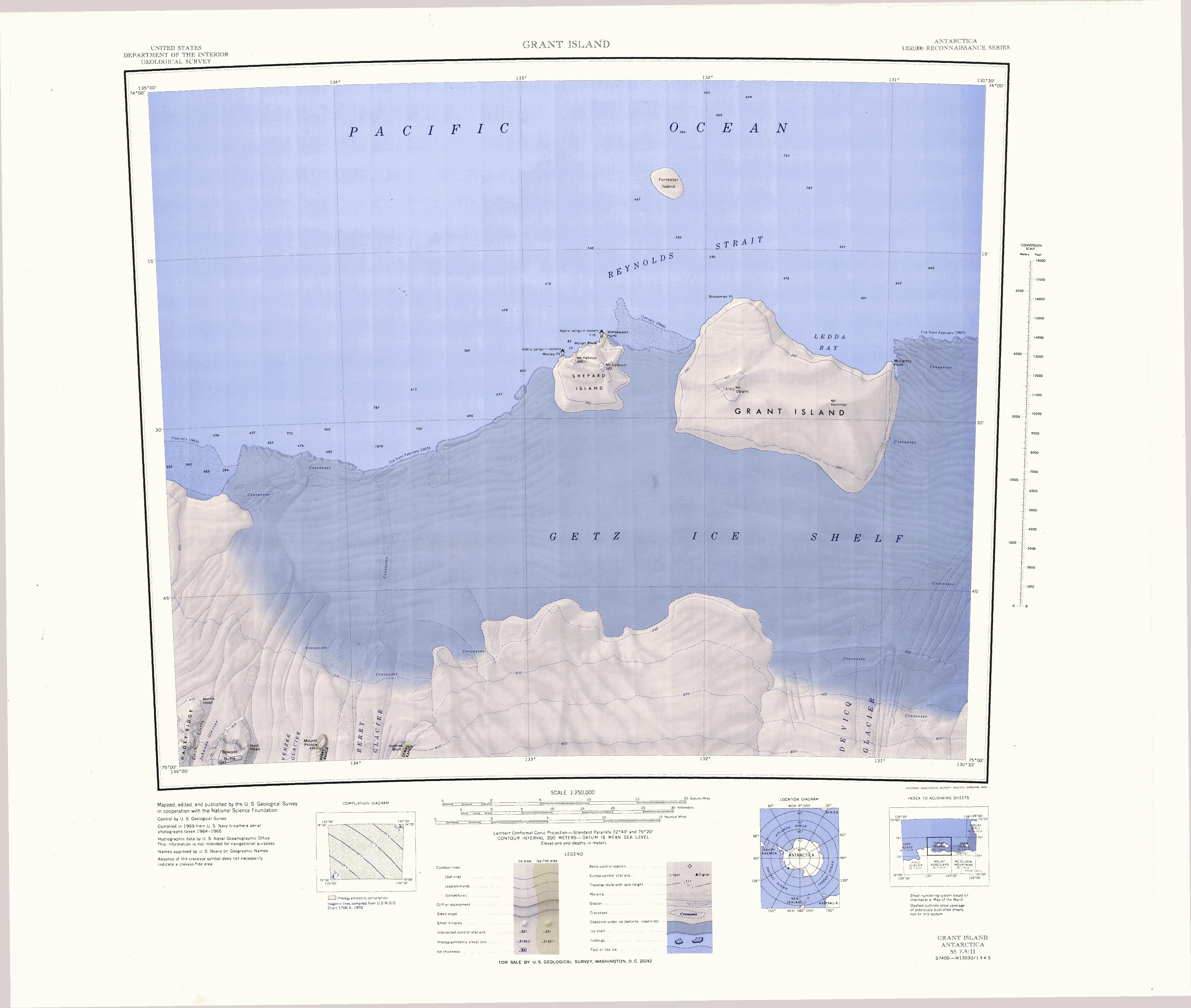
Shepard Island in center of map

Grant Island is in the north, seaward edge of the Getz Ice Shelf. Reynolds Strait is on its north side, which is indented by Ledda Bay, and separates it from Forrester Island. Shepard Island is to the west. Features, from west to east, include Brookman Point, Mount Obiglio, Mount Hummel and McCarthy Point.

== Discovery and name ==
Grant Island was discovered and charted by personnel aboard USS Glacier on February 4, 1962. It was named by the United States Advisory Committee on Antarctic Names (US-ACAN) for Commander E. G. Grant, Commanding Officer of USS Glacier at the time of discovery.

== Features and nearby features ==
=== Brookman Point ===
74°19′S 131°51′W. The snow-covered northwest point of Grant Island. Discovered and first charted from the USS Glacier (Captain Edwin A. McDonald, United States Navy) in February 1962. Named by US-ACAN for Lieutenant Peter J. Brookman, CEC, United States Navy, Officer-in-Charge at Byrd Station, 1970.

=== Mount Obiglio ===
74°27′S 131°50′W. A moderate rock summit 510 metres (1,670 ft) high in the west-central portion of Grant Island. Discovered and charted from the USS Glacier on February 4, 1962 during Operation Deep Freeze 1961-62. Named by US-ACAN for Lieutenant G.M. Obiglio, Argentine naval observer aboard the Glacier, at the suggestion of the Task Unit Commander, Captain Edwin A. McDonald, United States Navy.

=== Mount Hummel ===
74°28′S 131°19′W. A snow-capped summit that rises above the east-central portion of Grant Island. Discovered and first charted from the USS Glacier on February 4, 1962. Named by US-ACAN for Lieutenant (j.g.) William T. Hummel, United States Navy Reserve, helicopter pilot aboard Glacier at the time of discovery.

=== McCarthy Point ===
74°25′S 130°59′W. An ice-covered point that marks the northeast extremity of Grant Island. Discovered and charted from the USS Glacier on February 4, 1962. Named by US-ACAN for Lieutenant (j-g.) J.F. McCarthy, United States Navy, Disbursing Officer on the Glacier at the time of discovery.

=== Reynolds Strait ===
74°15′S 132°10′W. A strait between Forrester Island on the north and Shepard Island and Grant Island along the edge of Getz Ice Shelf on the south. The discovery of Forrester Island from USS Glacier on February 4, 1962 simultaneously established the existence of the strait, which was then sounded. The name was applied by US-ACAN for Ralph R. Reynolds (1938-73), Lieutenant Commander, CEC, United States Navy who was Officer-inCharge of the Navy Nuclear Power Unit at McMurdo Station in 1970.

=== Ledda Bay ===
74°23′S 131°20′W. A shallow embayment or bight, 12 nautical miles (22 km; 14 mi) long, in the north side of Grant Island. Discovered and first charted from the USS Glacier on February 4, 1962. Named for R.J. Ledda, QM3, United States Navy, quartermaster aboard the Glacier on the cruise in which the bay was discovered.

=== Forrester Island ===
74°09′S 132°13′W. An ice-capped island 3.5 nautical miles (6.5 km; 4.0 mi) long that lies 13 nautical miles (24 km; 15 mi) north-northeast of Shepard Island, off the Getz Ice Shelf. The island was discovered and charted from the USS Glacier on February 5, 1962. Named by US-ACAN after Lieutenant Commander John J. Forrester, United States Navy, Executive Officer aboard Glacier at the time of discovery.

== Sources ==
- Alberts, Fred G., ed. (1995), Geographic Names of the Antarctic (PDF) (2 ed.), United States Board on Geographic Names This article incorporates public domain material from websites or documents of the United States Board on Geographic Names.
- Grant Island, USGS: United States Geological Survey
- This article incorporates public domain material from websites or documents of the United States Geological Survey.
