= Armour Inlet =

Armour Inlet (73°38′S 124°39′W) is an ice-filled inlet indenting the north side of Siple Island just west of the Armour Peninsula, along the coast of Marie Byrd Land. The inlet was first roughly delineated from air photos taken by U.S. Navy Operation Highjump in January 1947, and named by the Advisory Committee on Antarctic Names for the Armour Institute of Technology, Chicago, which donated funds to the United States Antarctic Service, 1939–41, for purchase of the Snow Cruiser.
