= Blob =

Blob may refer to:

== Arts and entertainment ==
- The Blob (film series), a franchise of American science fiction monster-horror films
  - The Blob, 1958 American science-fiction film
  - The Blob (1988 film), a remake of the 1958 film
- The Blobs, a 1980 animated TV series
- Blob (video game), 1993
- B.O.B., a character in the 2009 animated film Monsters vs. Aliens
- Blob, a character in ClayFighter video games
- Blob (Marvel Comics), a comic book character
- Blobs, a former animated mascot of BBC Three
- Blob (card game), a variant of Oh Hell

== Science and technology ==
=== Computing ===
- Object storage, or blob storage, that manages data as "blobs" or "objects"
- Binary blob, or blob, a non-free object in open source software
- Blob URI scheme, a URI scheme for binary data
- Image blob, a region of an image subject to detection

=== Other uses in science ===
- Blob (visual system), sections of the primary visual cortex
- Physarum polycephalum, or the blob, a slime mold

== Other uses ==
- The Blob (Antarctica), a knoll on the north coast of Siple Island
- The blob (Chukchi Sea algae), a large algae bloom in 2009
- The Blob (Pacific Ocean), a mass of warm water in the Pacific 2013–2016
- Blob, related unit of slug (unit)
- Blob, mascot of the short-lived United States Football League team Philadelphia Stars (2022)
- Blob, synonym for "foreign policy establishment", introduced by Ben Rhodes

== See also ==
- Beware! The Blob, a sequel of the 1958 film
- A Boy and His Blob: Trouble on Blobolonia, 1989 video game
- A Boy and His Blob, 2009 video game
- Blobbing, an outdoor water activity
- Blobfish (disambiguation), the common name of several species
- Cold blob, a mass of cold water in the North Atlantic
- de Blob, a 2008 Wii video game
- The Problem Blob, a fictional villain in TV series the Numberjacks
