= Recely Bluff =

Snow and rock bluff on Mount Siple, Antarctica

Coordinates: 73°10′S 125°46′W

Recely Bluff is a snow and rock bluff on the northeast slope of Mount Siple on Siple Island. The bluff is 7 nautical miles (13 km) northeast of the summit of the mountain. It is mapped by the United States Geological Survey (USGS) from surveys and U.S. Navy aerial photography, 1959–65. It was named by the Advisory Committee on Antarctic Names (US-ACAN) for Frank J. Recely, Jr., a United States Antarctic Research Program (USARP) ionospheric physicist at Byrd Station in 1965.
