= Wright Island =

Island in Antarctica

- Location within Antarctica

Geography
- Location: Antarctica
- Coordinates: 74°2′S 116°50′W

Wright Island (74°02′S 116°50′W) is an ice-covered island 35 nautical miles (65 km; 40 mi) long, lying at the north edge of Getz Ice Shelf about midway between Carney Island and Martin Peninsula, on the Bakutis Coast, Marie Byrd Land, Antarctica.

== Location ==
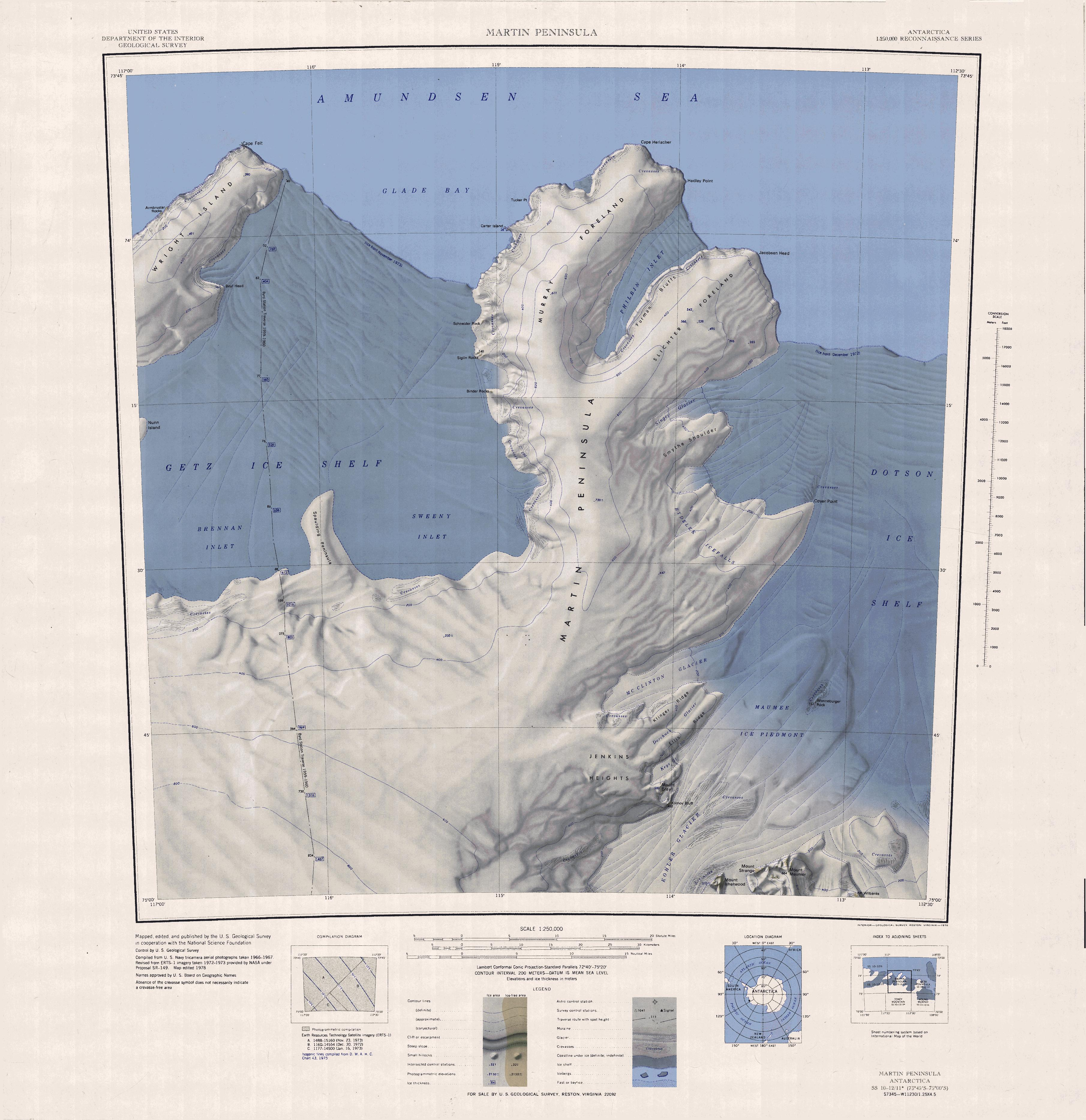
East side of the island in northwest of map

Wright Island is on the seaward side of the eastern end of the Getz Ice Shelf. Carney Island is to the west and Martin Peninsula is to the east. Nunn Island, Brennan Inlet and Spaulding Peninsula are to the south. Features include Beyl Head, Cape Felt and Armbruster Rocks.

== Discovery and naming ==
Wright Island was delineated from air photos taken by United States Navy Operation Highjump in January 1947. It was amed by the United States Advisory Committee on Antarctic Names (US-ACAN) after Admiral Jerauld Wright, U.S. Navy, Commander in Chief, Atlantic Fleet, in over-all command of the United States Navy's Operation Deep Freeze during the International Geophysical Year, 1957–58.

== Features ==
=== Beyl Head ===
74°05′S 116°31′W. An ice-covered headland midway on the east side of Wright Island. Named by US-ACAN in 1977 after Commander David D. Beyl, United States Navy, Operations Officer, Operation Deep Freeze 1976, with responsibility for planning the Dome Charlie aircraft recovery program which resulted in the successful recovery of two LC-130 aircraft damaged during Operation Deep Freeze 1975.

=== Cape Felt ===
73°52′S 116°23′W. An ice-covered cape which marks the north end of Wright Island. First mapped from air photos taken by United States Navy Operation Highjump in January 1947. Named by US-ACAN after Admiral Harry D. Felt, United States Navy, Vice Chief of Naval Operations in the post 1957-58 IGY period.

=== Armbruster Rocks ===
73°57′S 116°49′W. Exposed rocks on the west side of Wright Island, 9 nautical miles (17 km; 10 mi) southwest of Cape Felt. Mapped by the United States Geological Survey (USGS) from surveys and United States Navy aerial photographs, 1959-67. Named by US-ACAN after Lieutenant Robert B. Armbruster, United States Navy, Communications Officer at Christchurch, New Zealand, Operation Deep Freeze, 1963 and 1964.

== Sources ==
- Alberts, Fred G., ed. (1995), Geographic Names of the Antarctic (PDF) (2 ed.), United States Board on Geographic Names This article incorporates public domain material from websites or documents of the United States Board on Geographic Names.
- Martin Peninsula, USGS: United States Geological Survey
- This article incorporates public domain material from websites or documents of the United States Geological Survey.
