= Pink slime (disambiguation) =

Pink slime is a meat by-product.

Pink slime may also refer to:

- Pink-slime journalism, a practice in news media
- Pink Slime, an EP by Mac Miller
- Pink Slime, a slime from the indie game Slime Rancher
- Mugre rosa, 2020 novel by Fernanda Trías, translated into English in 2024 as Pink Slime

== See also ==
- Slime (disambiguation)
- Pink algae
