= Green slime =

Green slime may refer to:

== Arts and entertainment ==
- The Green Slime, a 1968 tokusatsu science fiction film
- "Green Slime", a 1984 song by The Fuzztones
- Green Slime, a Dungeons & Dragons entity
- Green slime, a component of TV series You Can't Do That on Television

== Other uses ==
- Green Slime, internal nickname for soldiers of the British Army Intelligence Corps

== See also ==
- Slime (disambiguation)
- Gunge
