= Subsurface lithoautotrophic microbial ecosystem =

Subsurface lithoautotrophic microbial ecosystems, or "SLIMEs" (also abbreviated "SLMEs" or "SLiMEs"), are a type of endolithic ecosystems. They are defined by Edward O. Wilson as "unique assemblages of bacteria and fungi that occupy pores in the interlocking mineral grains of igneous rock beneath Earth's surface."

Endolithic systems are still at an early stage of exploration. In some cases their biota can support simple invertebrates; in most, organisms are unicellular. Near-surface layers of rock may contain blue-green algae but most energy comes from chemical synthesis of minerals. The limited supply of energy limits the rates of growth and reproduction. In deeper rock layers microbes are exposed to high pressures and temperatures.
