= Slime coat =

Fish integument

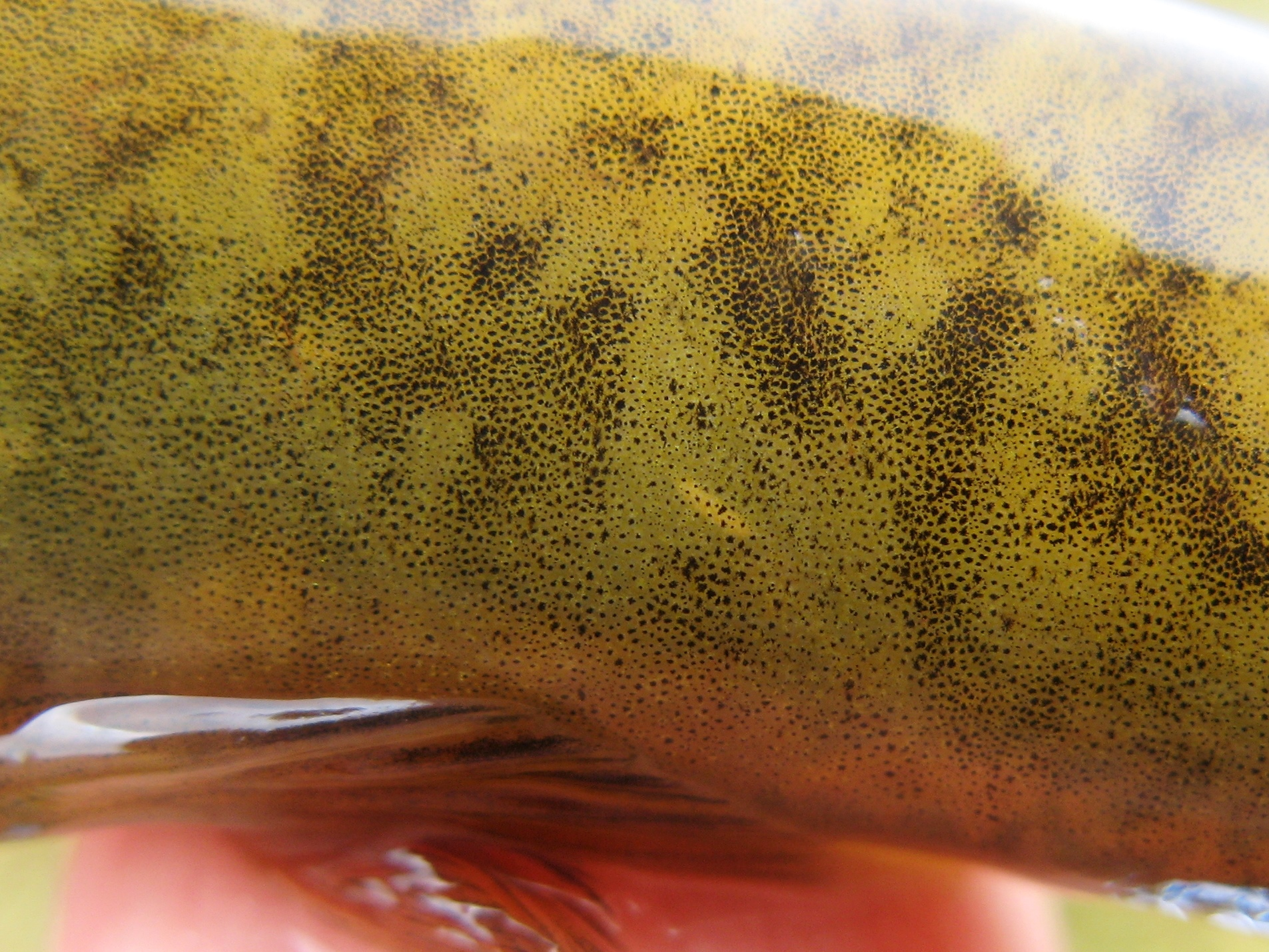
A closeup of the skin on an Eldon's galaxias

The slime coat (also fish slime, mucus layer or slime layer) is the coating of mucus covering the body of all fish. An important part of fish anatomy, it serves many functions, depending on species, ranging from locomotion, care and feeding of offspring, to resistance against diseases and parasites.

The mucin making up the slime coat is secreted by goblet cells in the fish's epidermis. The slime contains a variety of antimicrobial peptides and other antimicrobial components such as lysozyme and C-reactive protein. It contains mycosporine-like amino acids to protect from ultraviolet radiation.

== Locomotion ==
The slime coat of some fish aids in more efficient swimming by reducing drag, attributed to the Toms effect. Slime can reduce the friction experienced by the fish by up to 65%. Generally, the faster the fish, the greater reduction in drag provided by the slime, but there are a few exceptions.

In schooling fish, slime shed by leading fish is thought to provide a hydrodynamic benefit to following fish.

== As a defensive adaptation ==
The slime coat of reef fish contains mycosporine-like amino acids (MAAs) which protect the fish from sun damage by absorbing radiation. The greatest number of MAAs is found on the dorsal side of the fish, which is exposed to more radiation. Animals cannot synthesize MAAs, requiring fish to sequester them from their diet.

Under water, fish are exposed to a greater number of microorganisms than animals whose skin is exposed mainly to air. In the absence of a stratum corneum, the slime coat serves to protect the fish from attack from harmful microorganisms. This is chiefly done by sloughing off microbes which become trapped in the slime coat, but the slime coat contains antimicrobial peptides and other defensive properties such as lysozyme and C-reactive protein.

Parrotfish create extra mucus during sleep which covers their bodies in a cocoon-like structure. It protects them from predators and parasites by masking their scent and providing a physical barrier against them.

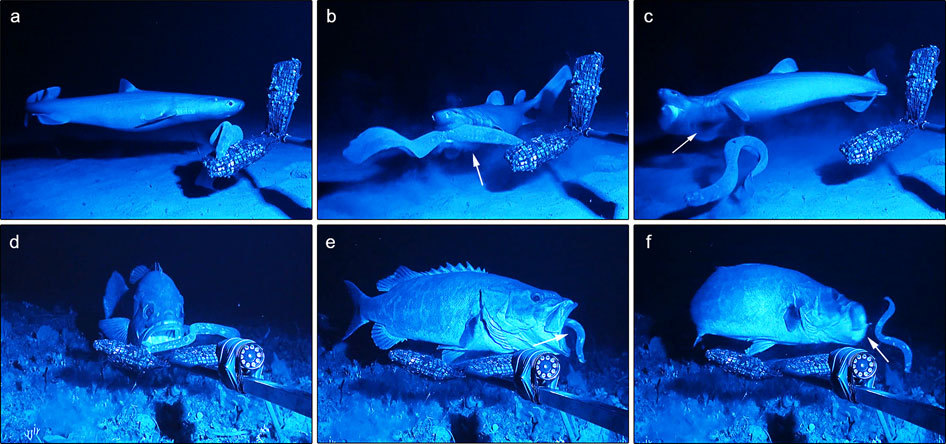
A seal shark (top, a–c) and an Atlantic wreckfish (bottom, d–f) each attempt to prey on a hagfish.

The slime of the hagfish is unique due to its volume and dilution. In these fish it serves as an anti-predator adaptation: when grabbed by a predator fish, the hagfish ejects copious amounts of slime into the predator's mouth, causing the predator to gag and flare its gills, releasing the hagfish and moving away.

== Human importance ==
In pisciculture and fishkeeping, the slime coat is important to the health of fish, particularly during transport which can cause damage to it. High ammonia levels in the water can also cause damage to the slime coat.

The antimicrobial properties of fish slime have been studied as an alternative to antibiotic drugs to address antibiotic resistance.

== See also ==
- Snail slime
