= Blob URI scheme =

URI scheme used for accessing local data via APIs for URLs

The blob URI scheme, also known as an object URL, is a Uniform Resource Identifier (URI) scheme used for accessing locally generated data via APIs designed to work only with URLs. A blob URI looks like blob:https://example.com/550e8400-e29b-41d4-a716-446655440000, with the end of the URI being a universally unique identifier.

== See also ==
- data URI scheme
