= Perry Range =

Range of mountains on the coast of Marie Byrd Land (Antarctica)

- Location within Antarctica

Geography
- Continent: Antarctica
- Region: Marie Byrd Land
- Range coordinates: 75°0′S 134°12′W

Perry Range (75°0′S 134°12′W) is a narrow range of mountains, 6 nautical miles (11 km; 6.9 mi) long, separating the lower ends of Venzke Glacier and Berry Glacier where they enter Getz Ice Shelf, on the coast of Marie Byrd Land, Antarctica.

== Location ==
The Perry Range trends from north to south. It is south of the Getz Ice Shelf on the coast of Marie Byrd Land, and lies between the Venzke Glacier to the west and the Berry Glacier to the east. Features, from north to south, include Mount Prince, Mount Soond, Bleclic Peaks and Schloredt Nunatak. Features further south, also on the west side of Berry Glacier, include Bennett Bluff, Peacock Peak and Poindexter Peak.

== Discovery and name ==
The Perry Range was discovered and photographed from aircraft of the United States Antarctic Service (USAS) in December 1940. It was named by United States Advisory Committee on Antarctic Names (US-ACAN) for Lieutenant John E. Perry, CEC, United States Navy, Public Works Officer at McMurdo Station in 1968. He commanded the Antarctic Construction Battalion Unit from January 1969 until it was decommissioned in May 1971, when he became project manager for the South Pole Station.

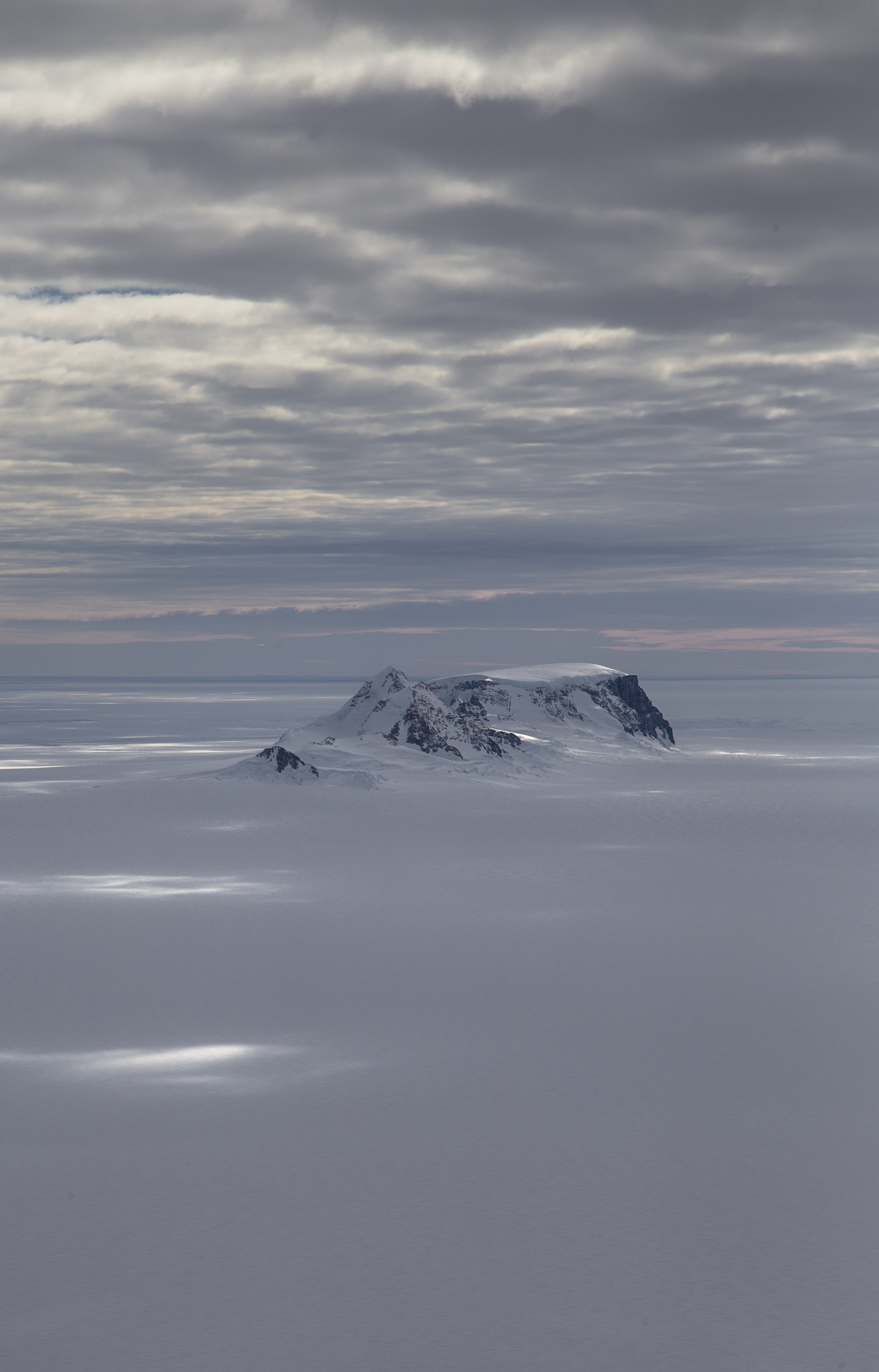
Aerial view of the range

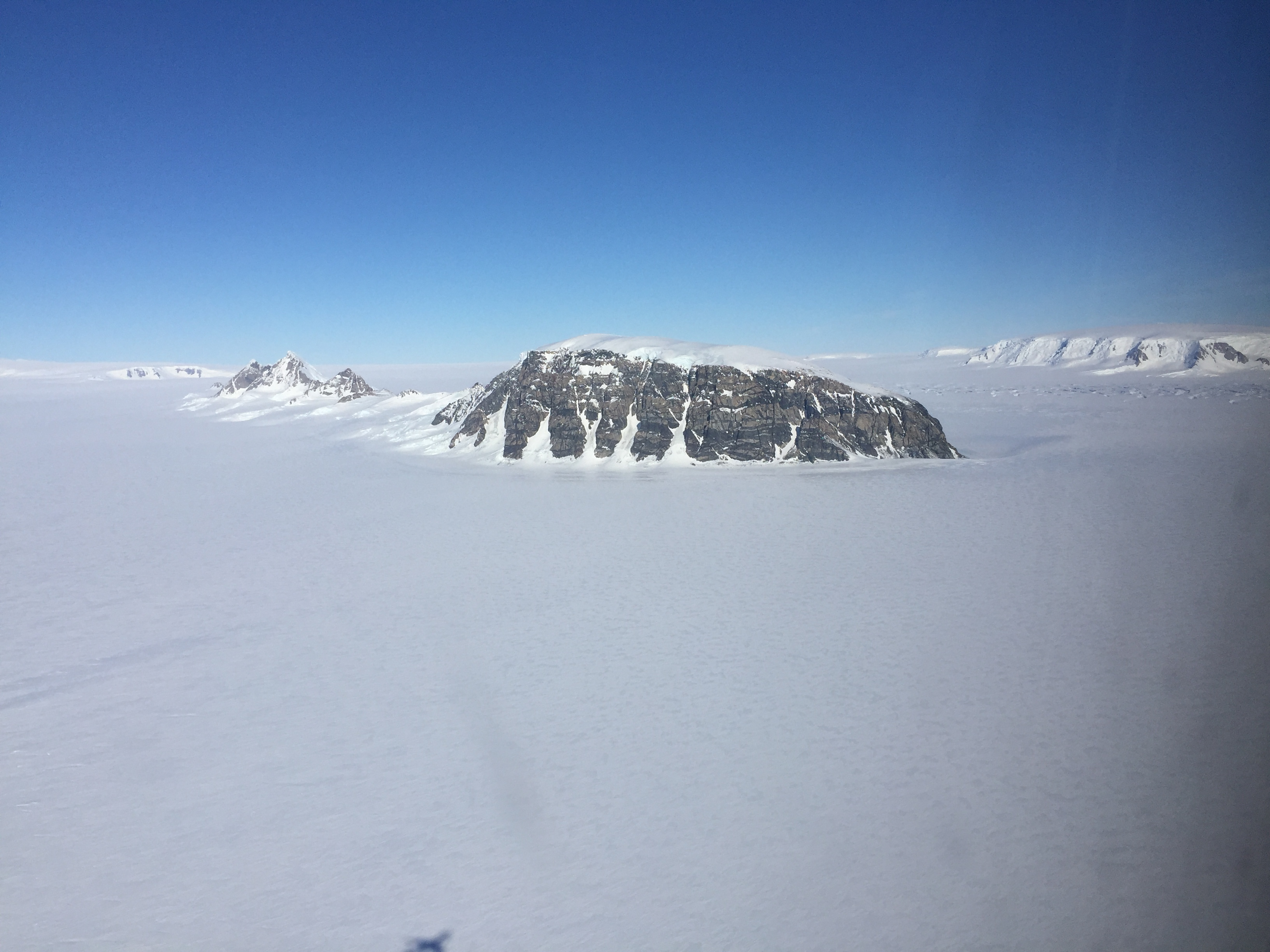
Mount Prince in November 2016

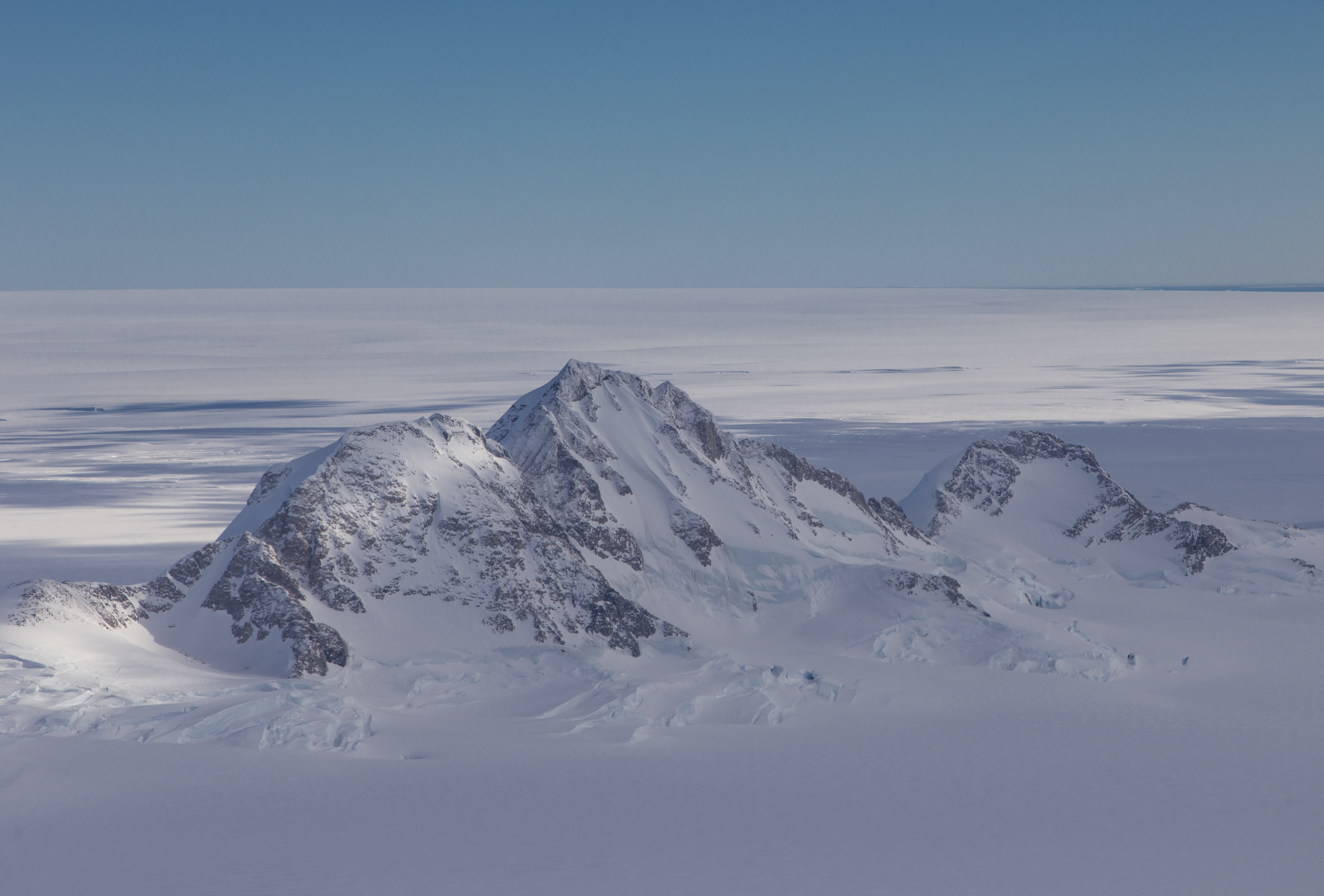
Bleclic Peaks

== Features ==
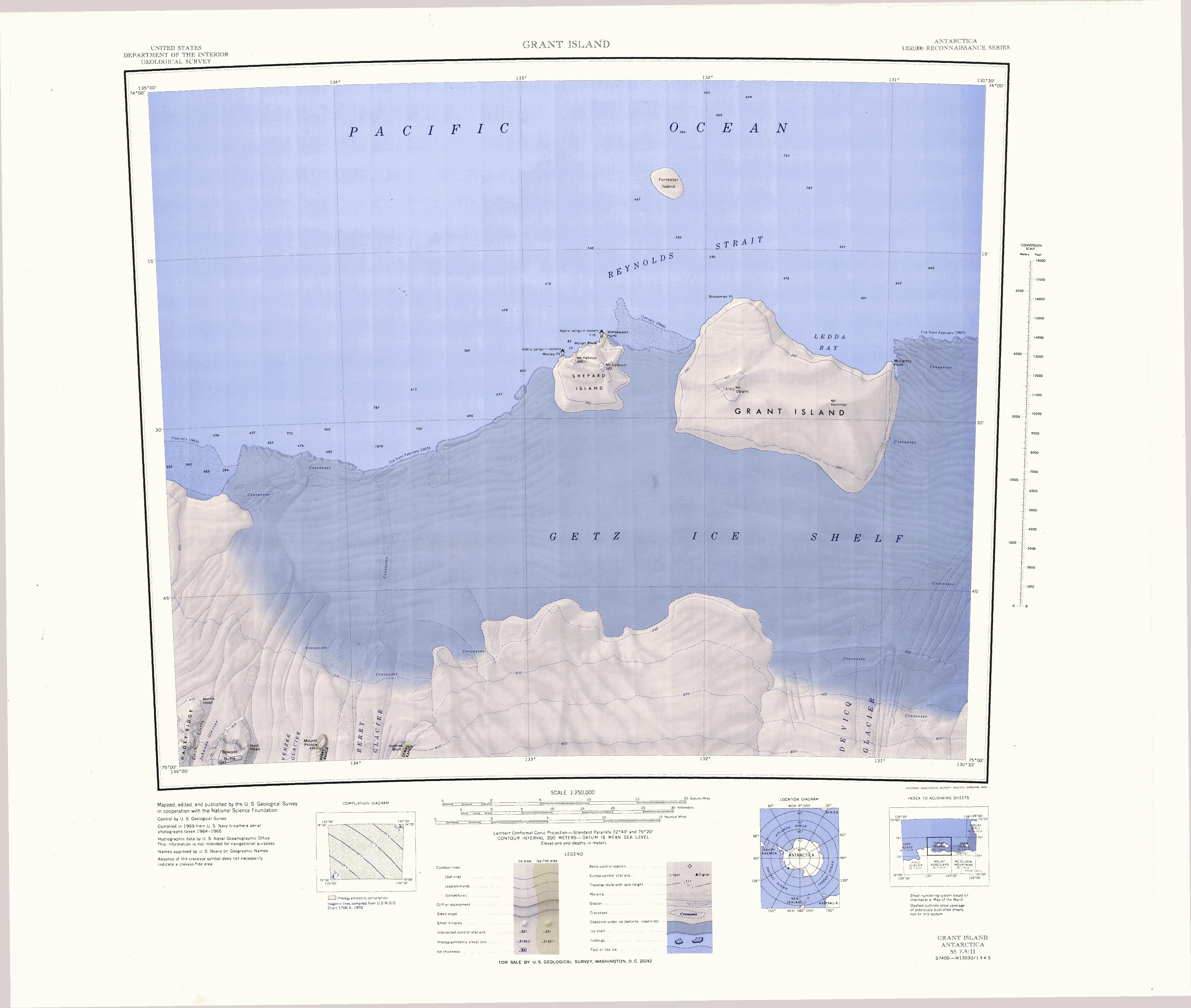
Perry Range in southwest of map

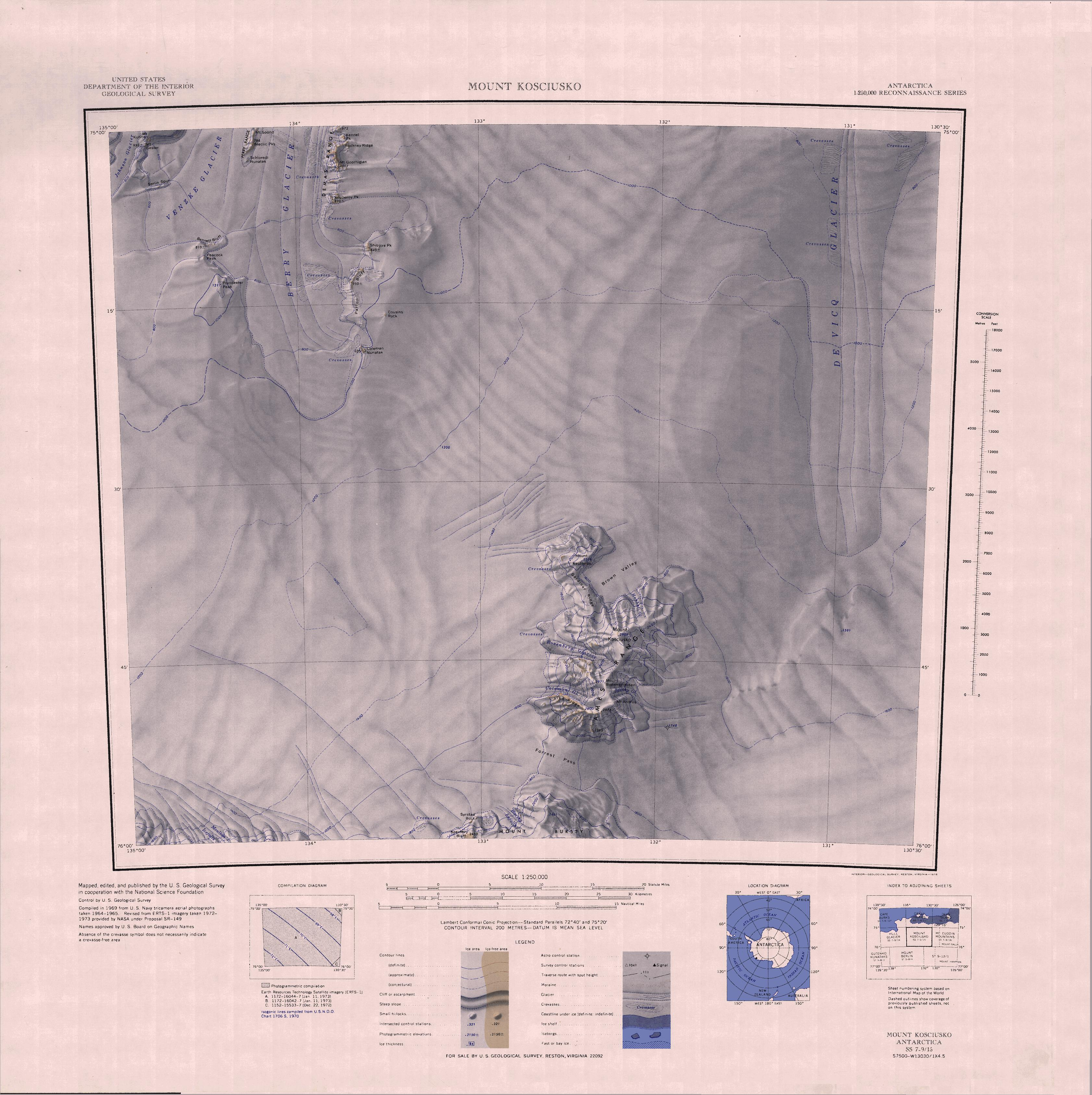
Perry Range in northwest of map

Features and nearby features to the south include:

=== Mount Prince ===
74°58′S 134°11′W. A prominent butte 640 metres (2,100 ft) high marking the north end of Perry Range. The feature was discovered and photographed from aircraft of the US AS, 1939-41, and was mapped by the United States Geological Survey (USGS) from surveys and air photos, 1959-65. It was named by US-ACAN for Joseph F. Prince, ADR2, United States Navy, Aviation Machinist's Mate with Squadron VXE-6 who participated in several Deep Freeze operations and wintered over at Little America V (1956) and McMurdo Station (1966).

=== Mount Soond ===
75°00′S 134°13′W. A peak 1 nautical mile (1.9 km; 1.2 mi) north of Bleclic Peaks. Mapped by USGS from surveys and United States Navy air photos, 1959-65. Named by US-ACAN for Robert T. Soond, geomagnetist-seismologist at Plateau Station, 1968.

=== Bleclic Peaks ===
75°01′S 134°14′W. Two peaks near the southern end of the Perry Range. Mapped by USGS from surveys and United States Navy air photos, 1959-65. Named by US-ACAN for John P. Bleclic, AGC, United States Navy, senior aerographer's mate on USS Glacier in these coastal waters, 1961-62.

=== Schloredt Nunatak ===
75°03′S 134°15′W. A nunatak 1 nautical mile (1.9 km; 1.2 mi) south of Bleclic Peaks, at the south extremity of the Perry Range. Mapped by USGS from surveys and United States Navy air photos, 1959-65. Named by US-ACAN for Jerry L. Schloredt, Chief Construction Electrician, United States Navy, who served as Nuclear Power Plant Operator with the Naval Nuclear Power Unit at McMurdo Station, 1966, 1967 and 1969.

=== Bennett Bluff ===
75°10′S 134°30′W. A bluff 810 metres (2,660 ft) high between the upper reaches of Venzke Glacier and Berry Glacier, 7 nautical miles (13 km; 8.1 mi) south-southwest of the Perry Range. The bluff has prominent rock exposures on the north wall and was first observed and photographed from aircraft of the USAS on December 18, 1940. I was mapped in detail by USGS, 1959-65. Named by US-ACAN for Clarence E. Bennett, ATI, United States Navy, Aviation Electronics Technician with Squadron VX-6 and a member of the McMurdo Station winter party, 1963.

=== Peacock Peak ===
75°11′S 134°30′W. A peak 1 nautical mile (1.9 km; 1.2 mi) south of Bennett Bluff on the west side of upper Berry Glacier. Mapped by USGS from surveys and United States Navy air photos, 1959-65. Named by US-ACAN for Dennis S. Peacock, ionospheric physicist at Byrd Station, 1970-71.

=== Poindexter Peak ===
75°13′S 134°25′W. Snow-covered peak 1,215 metres (3,986 ft) high rising 4 nautical miles (7.4 km; 4.6 mi) southeast of Bennett Bluff, along the west side of upper Berry Glacier. Mapped by USGS from surveys and United States Navy air photos, 1959-65. Named by US-ACAN for Monte F. Poindexter, United States Antarctic Research Program (USARP) meteorologist at Byrd Station, 1962.

== Sources ==
- Alberts, Fred G., ed. (1995), Geographic Names of the Antarctic (PDF) (2 ed.), United States Board on Geographic Names This article incorporates public domain material from websites or documents of the United States Board on Geographic Names.
- Grant Island, USGS: United States Geological Survey
- Mount Kosciusco, USGS: United States Geological Survey
- This article incorporates public domain material from websites or documents of the United States Geological Survey.
