= Oobleck =

Oobleck may refer to:

- Oobleck, a non-Newtonian fluid suspension of starch in water
  - Bartholomew and the Oobleck, a Doctor Seuss novel, after which oobleck is named
  - Dr. Bartholomew Oobleck, an RWBY character
- Theater Oobleck, a theater company in Chicago, US
