= Shepard Island =

Island in Marie Byrd Land, Antarctica

- Location within Antarctica

Geography
- Location: Antarctica
- Coordinates: 74°25′S 132°30′W
- Length: 18 km (11.2 mi)

Administration
- Administered under the Antarctic Treaty System

Demographics
- Population: Uninhabited

Shepard Island (74°25′S 132°30′W) is an island about 11 nautical miles (20 km; 13 mi) long, lying 6 nautical miles (11 km; 6.9 mi) west of Grant Island off the coast of Marie Byrd Land, Antarctica. The island is ice capped except at its northern, seaward side, and is almost wholly embedded in the Getz Ice Shelf.

== Location ==
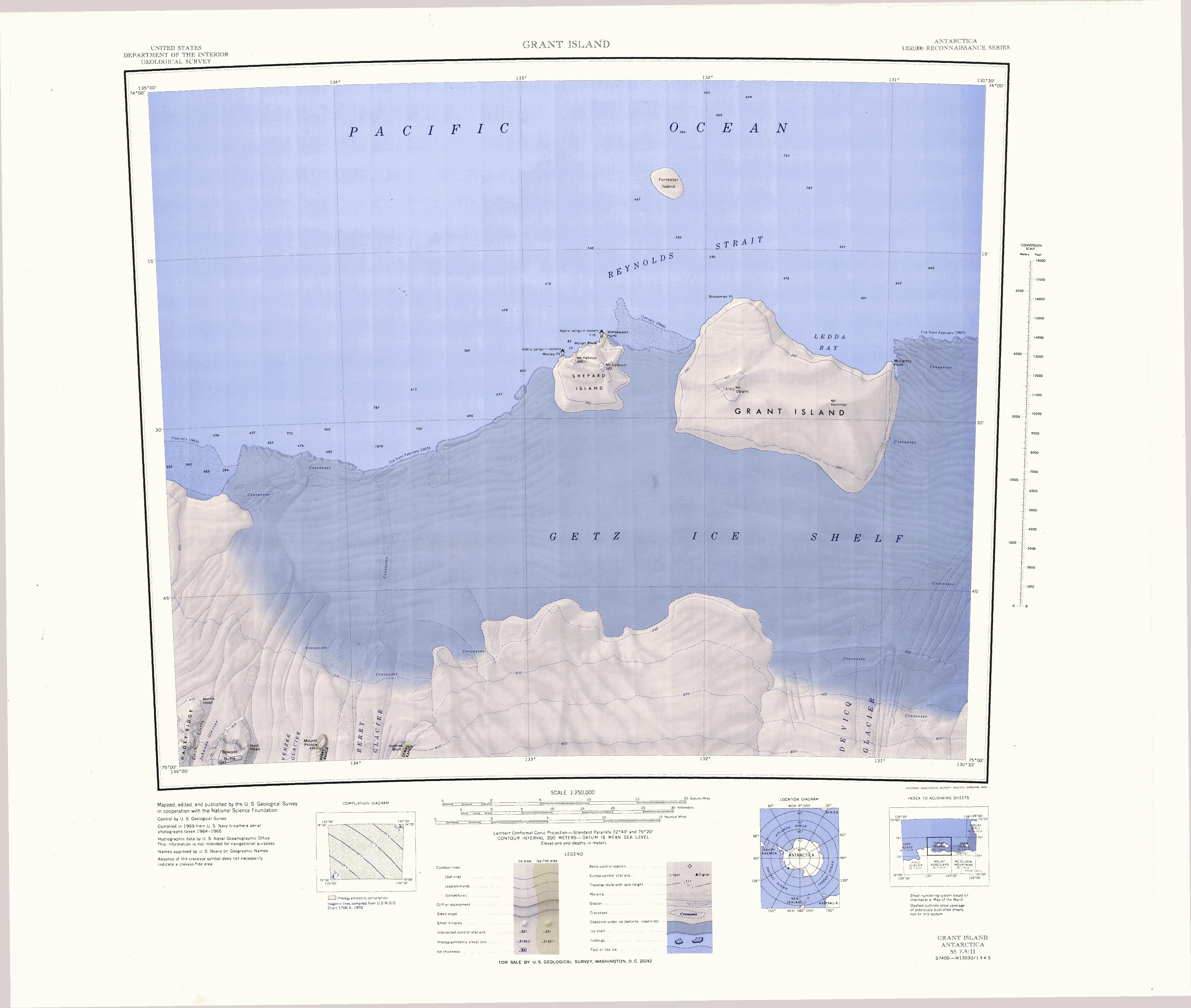
Shepard Island in center of map

Shepard Island is in the north of the Getz Ice Shelf. Reynolds Strait is on its north side, separating it from Forrester Island. Grant Island is to the east. It is home to two Adélie penguin rookeries on its north shore. Features, from west to east, include Worley Point, Mount Petinos, Moran Bluff, Mathewson Point and Mount Colburn.

== Discovery and name ==
Shepard Island was discovered by the United States Antarctic Service (USAS) Expedition (1939–1941) and named for John Shepard Jr., a contributor to the expedition.

== Features ==
=== Worley Point ===
74°24′S 132°47′W. A rock point, the site of an Adelie penguin rookery, forming the northwest corner of Shepard Island. Like Grant Island, 5 nautical miles (9.3 km; 5.8 mi) eastward, Shepard Island is surrounded by the Getz Ice Shelf except on the north side. The point was charted from the USS Glacier (Captain Edwin A. McDonald, United States Navy) on February 4, 1962. Name applied by the United States Advisory Committee on Antarctic Names (US-ACAN) for Lieutenant Richard J. Worley, United States Navy, Medical Officer at South Pole Station, 1969.

=== Mount Petinos ===
74°25′S 132°43′W. A mountain 500 metres (1,600 ft) high located 1 nautical mile (1.9 km; 1.2 mi) east-southeast of Worley Point in the northwest part of Shepard Island. Mapped from the USS Glacier on February 4, 1962. Named for Lieutenant (j.g.) Frank Petinos, United States Navy, First Lieutenant aboard the Glacier.

=== Moran Bluff ===
74°23′S 132°37′W. A steep coastal bluff close west of Mathewson Point on the north side of Shepard Island. The feature was visited by personnel of USS Glacier on February 4, 1962. Name applied by US-ACAN for Gerald F. Moran, CM1, United States Navy, construction mechanic who wintered over at McMurdo Station (1965) and Plateau Station (1968), and worked at Byrd Station, summer season 1969-70.

=== Mathewson Point ===
74°23′S 132°33′W. A steep, rocky point at the north tip of Shepard Island. The point, the site of an Adélie penguin rookery, was charted by personnel of the USS Glacier on February 4, 1962. Named by US-ACAN for Lieutenant (j.g.) David S. Mathewson, United States Navy, then supply officer of the Glacier.

=== Mount Colburn ===
74°25′S 132°33′W. A mountain, 520 metres (1,710 ft) high, rising above the east-central part of Shepard Island. Mapped from the USS Glacier on February 4, 1962. Named by US-ACAN for Lieutenant (j.g.) Richard E. Colburn, United States Navy, Communications Officer on the Glacier.

== Sources ==
- Alberts, Fred G., ed. (1995), Geographic Names of the Antarctic (PDF) (2 ed.), United States Board on Geographic Names This article incorporates public domain material from websites or documents of the United States Board on Geographic Names.
- Grant Island, USGS: United States Geological Survey
- This article incorporates public domain material from websites or documents of the United States Geological Survey.
