= Mount Siple =

Antarctic shield volcano

Highest point
- Elevation: 3,162 m (10,374 ft)
- Prominence: 3,162 m (10,374 ft); Ranked 78th
- Listing: Island high point Ultra
- Coordinates: 73°26′S 126°40′W

Geography
- Location within Antarctica
- Location: Siple Island, Antarctica

Geology
- Rock age: Unknown
- Mountain type: Shield volcano
- Volcanic field: Marie Byrd Land Volcanic Province
- Last eruption: Unknown

Climbing
- First ascent: Unclimbed

Mount Siple (/ˈsaɪpəl/ SIGH-p'l) is a potentially active Antarctic shield volcano, rising to 3,162 metres (10,374 ft) and dominating the northwest part of Siple Island, which is separated from the Bakutis Coast, Marie Byrd Land, by the Getz Ice Shelf. Its youthful appearance strongly suggests that it last erupted in the Holocene. It is capped by a 4-by-5-kilometre (2.5 mi × 3.1 mi) summit caldera, and tuff cones lie on the lower flanks. Recely Bluff is on the northeast slope of the mountain, about 7 nautical miles (13 km) from the peak. Its volume of 1,800 cubic kilometres (430 cu mi) is comparable to that of Mount Erebus.

Mount Siple is named after Paul A. Siple (1908–68), a US Antarctic explorer and geographer who took part in six Antarctic expeditions, including the two Byrd expeditions of 1928–30 and 1933–35 (Siple Coast, Siple Island). He was in command of the West Base of the US Antarctic Service (USAS), 1939–41, and was navigator on all major exploratory flights from the base, including the flight on which Mount Siple was discovered.

Adele Penguins nest on the side of Mount Siple

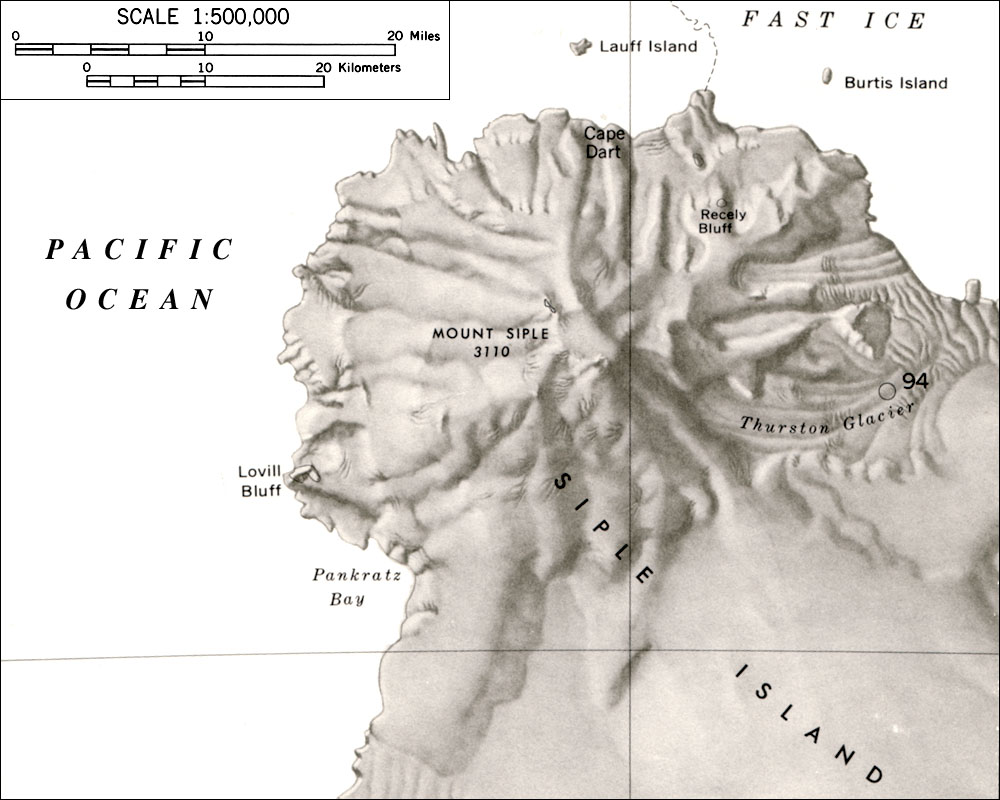

The volcano was visited in February 2017 as part of the Swiss Polar Institute's Antarctic Circumnavigation Expedition. Al Jazeera English Science and Technology editor Tarek Bazley was on board and filed a news report on his visit to a colony of Adélie penguins breeding there.

== See also ==
- List of volcanoes in Antarctica
- List of Ultras of Antarctica
- List of islands by highest point
