= Getz Ice Shelf =

Ice shelf in Marie Byrd Land, Antarctica

- Ice shelf
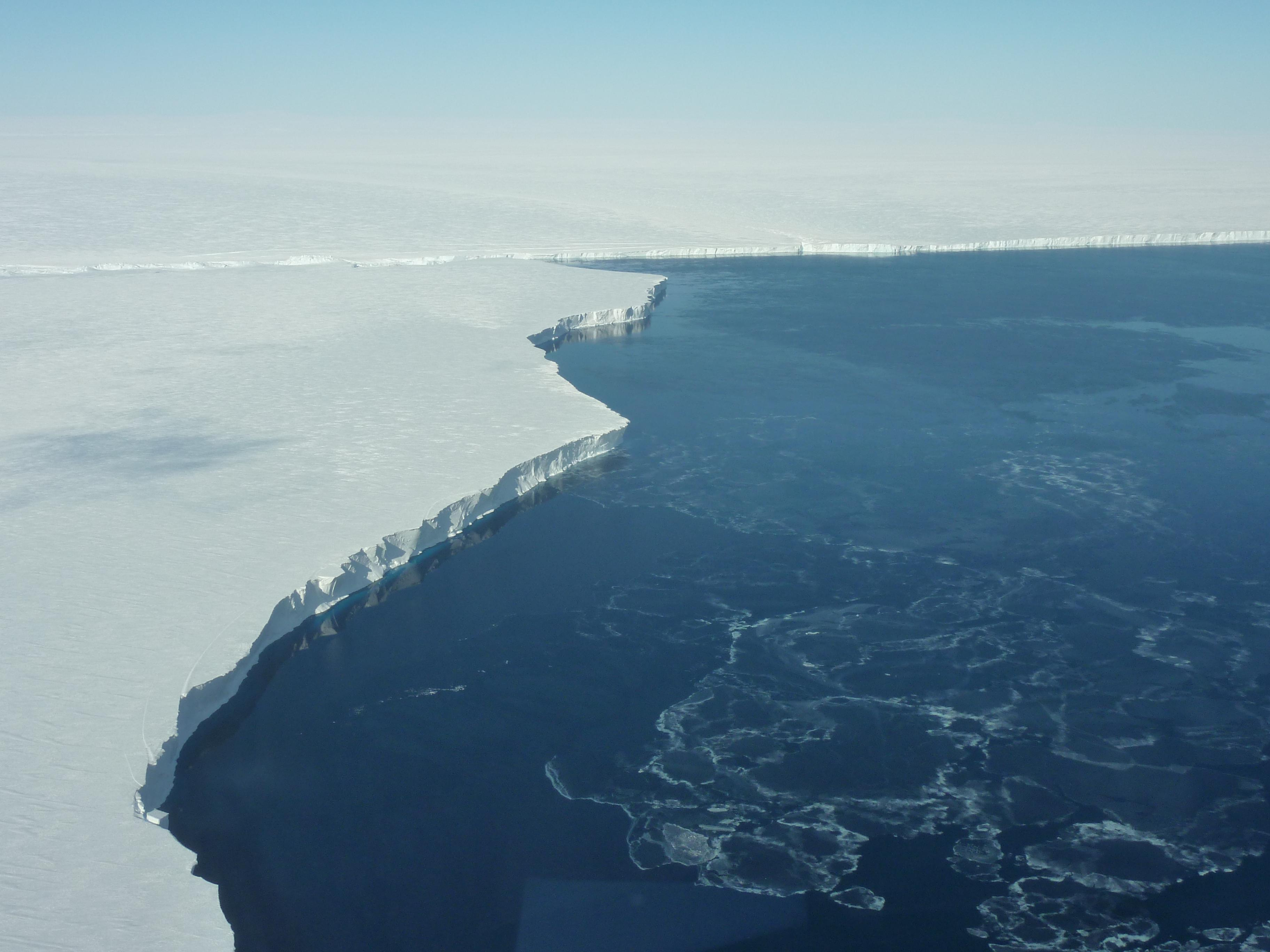
- Getz Ice Shelf 2010

- Location within Antarctica
- Coordinates: 74°15′S 125°00′W
- Location: Marie Byrd Land, Antarctica
- Water bodies: Southern Ocean

The Getz Ice Shelf (74°15′S 125°00′W) is an ice shelf over 300 nautical miles (560 km; 350 mi) long and from 20 to 60 nautical miles (37 to 111 km; 23 to 69 mi) wide, bordering the Hobbs Coast and Bakutis Coast of Marie Byrd Land, Antarctica, between the McDonald Heights and Martin Peninsula. Several large islands are partially or wholly embedded in the ice shelf.

== Location ==
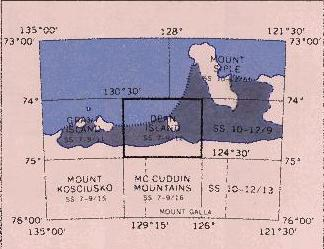
Western ice shelf Shepard to Carney islands

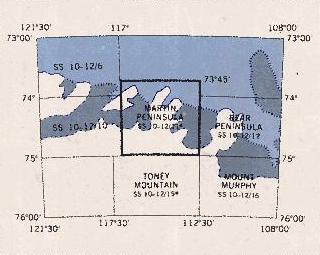
Eastern ice shelf Carney Island to Martin Peninsula

The Getz Ice Shelf extends along the north shore of Marie Byrd Land, from Hanessian Foreland and McDonald Heights in the west to Cape Herlacher on the Martin Peninsula to the east. The western section lies along the Hobbs Coast, while the section east of Dean Island lies along the full length of the Bakutis Coast. In the west the ice sheet is fed by glaciers that include, from west to east, Johnson Glacier, Venzke Glacier, Berry Glacier and DeVicq Glacier.

== Discovery and name ==
The ice shelf westward of Siple Island was discovered by the United States Antarctic Service (USAS) in December 1940. The portion eastward of Siple Island was first delineated from air photos taken by United States Navy Operation Highjump, 1946–47. The entire feature was mapped by the United States Geological Survey (USGS) from U.S. Navy air photos of 1962–65. It was named by the USAS (1939–41) for George F. Getz of Chicago, who helped furnish the seaplane for the expedition.

== Glaciology ==
Summer temperature and salinity measurements from 1994 to 2010 show the shelf is subject to more changeable oceanic forcing than other Antarctic shelves. Beneath cold surface waters, the thermocline was ~200 m shallower in 2007 than in 2000, indicative of shifting access of deep water to the continental shelf and ice shelf base. The calculated area-average basal melt rates was between 1.1 and 4.1 m of ice per year, making Getz the largest source of meltwater to the Southern Ocean.

In February 2021, it was reported that the fourteen glaciers forming the shelf had all sped up, and had lost 315 gigatonnes of ice since 1994. The cause of the speed up has been posited as "ocean forcing", a process where relatively warm deep ocean water melts the glaciers from below.

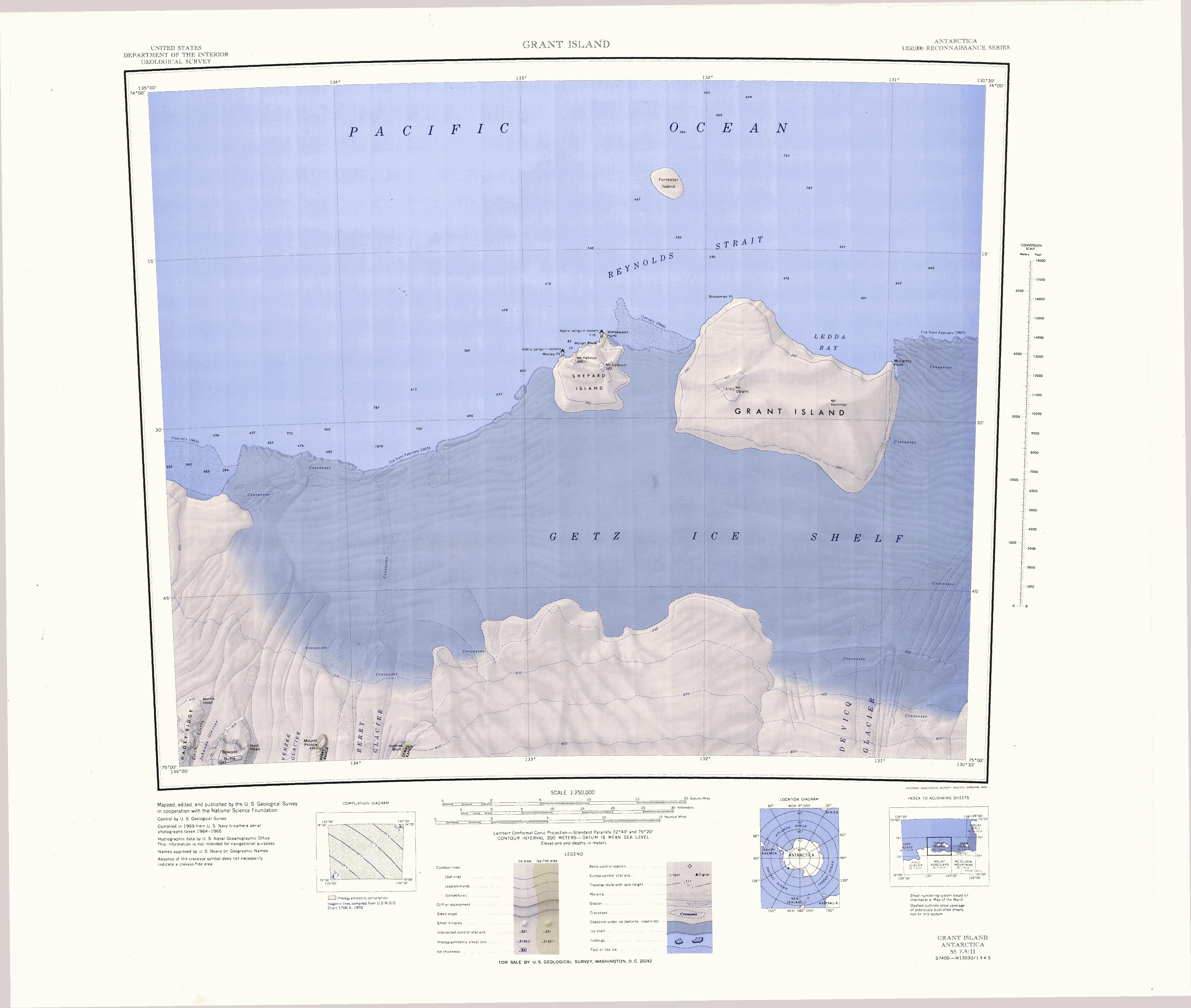
Shepard and Grant island

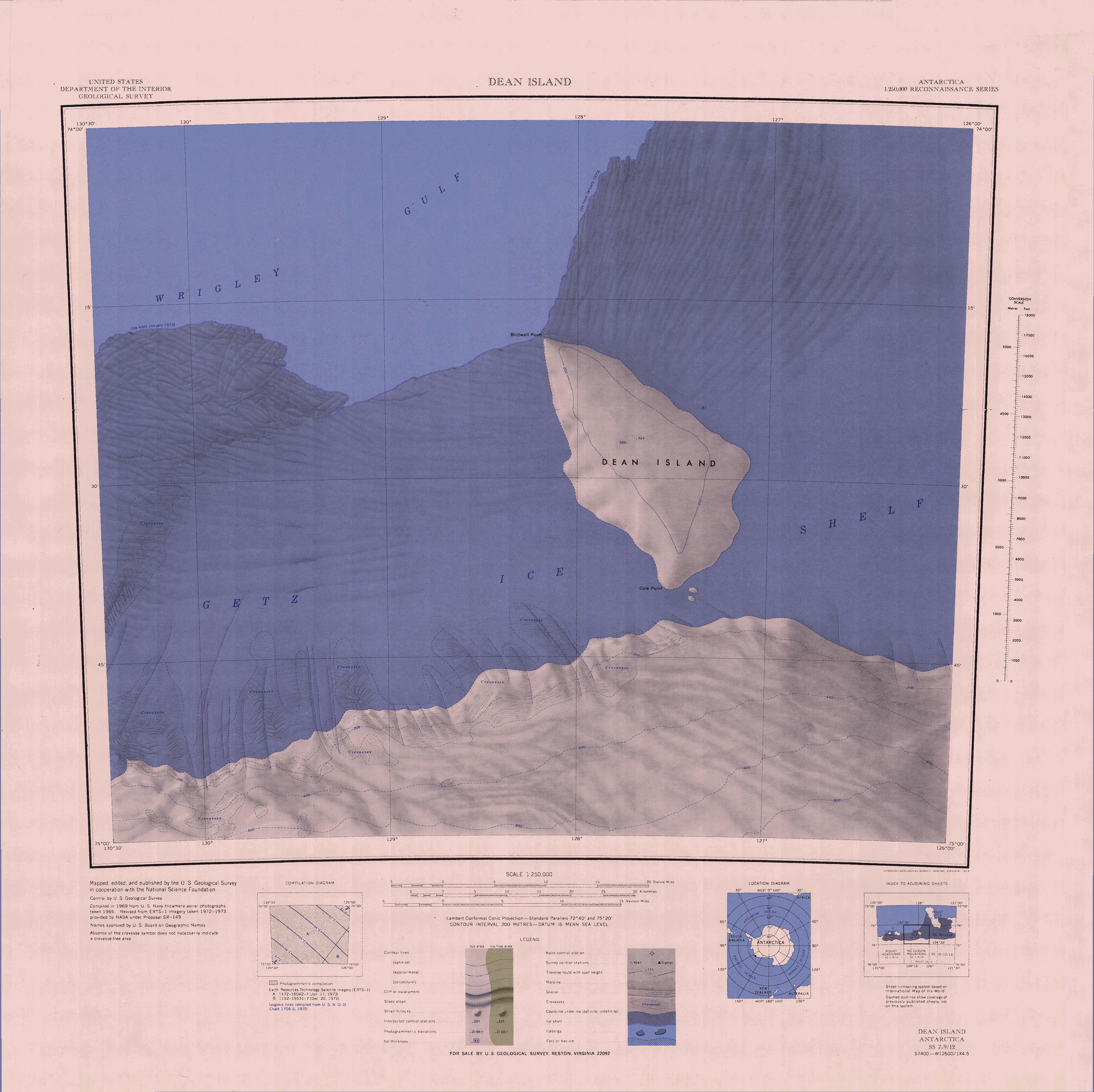
Dean Island

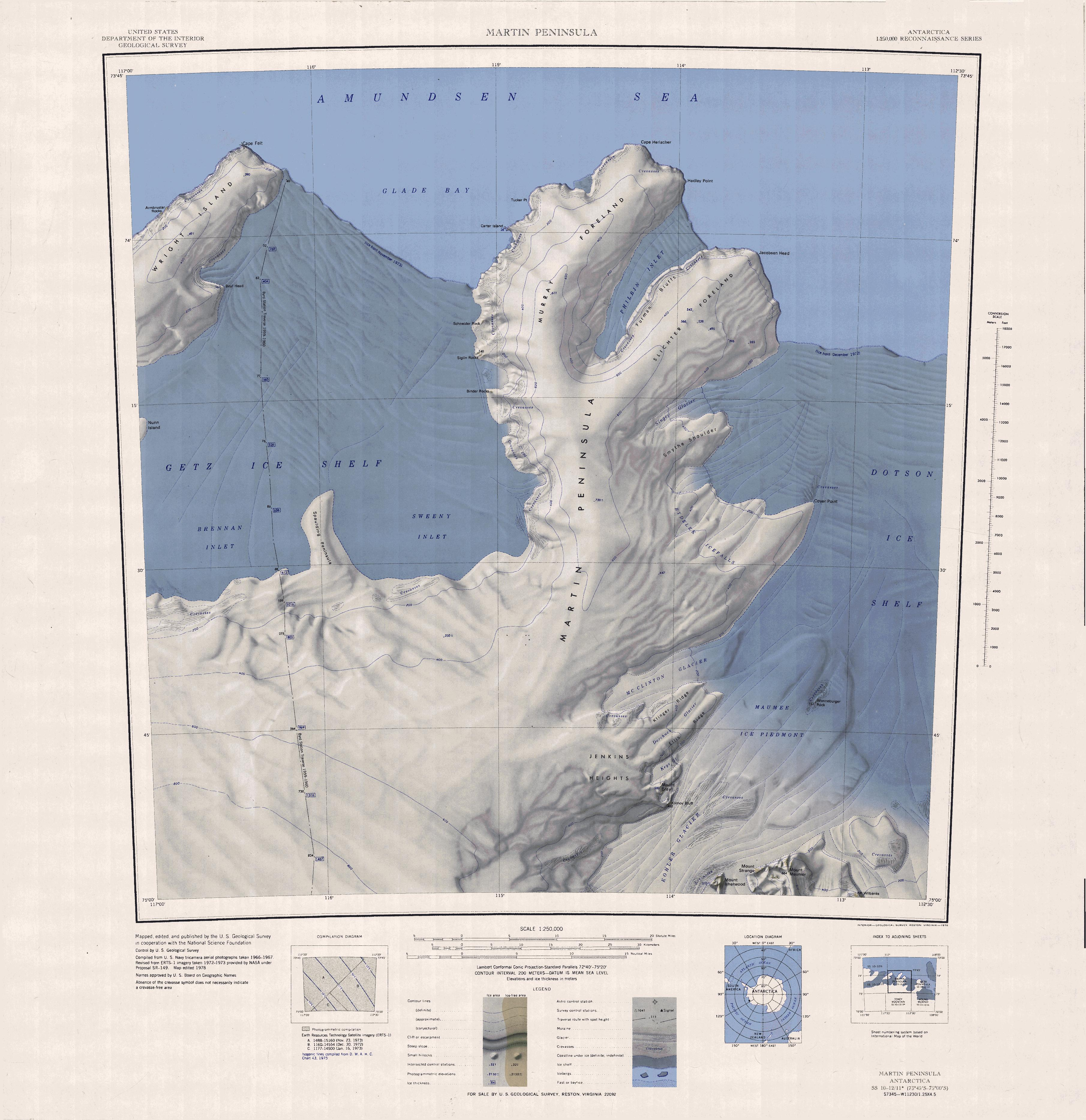
Wright Island and Martin Peninsula in the east

== Glaciers ==
From west to east, glaciers include:

=== Johnson Glacier ===
74°55′S 134°45′W. A glacier flowing north between McDonald Heights and Bowyer Butte to merge with Getz Ice Shelf. Mapped by USGS from surveys and United States Navy air photos, 1959-65. Named by US-ACAN for Roland L. Johnson, Boatswain's Mate, United States Navy, crew member of the USS Glacier during exploration of this coast in the 1961-62 season.

=== Venzke Glacier ===
75°00′S 134°24′W. A broad glacier flowing northward between Bowyer Butte and Perry Range into Getz Ice Shelf on the coast of Marie Byrd Land. The glacier was discovered and photographed from aircraft of the United States Antarctic Service in December 1940. It was mapped in detail by USGS from surveys and United States Navy photographs, 1959-66. Named by US-ACAN for Captain Norman C. Venzke, USCG, Commanding Officer of USCGC Northwind in Antarctica, 1972 and 1973, and a participant in several other Deep Freeze operations as ship's company officer aboard icebreakers.

=== Berry Glacier ===
75°00′S 134°00′W. Glacier, about 25 nautical miles (46 km; 29 mi) long and 5 nautical miles (9.3 km; 5.8 mi) wide, draining north between Perry Range and Demas Range into the Getz Ice Shelf. This vicinity was first photographed and rudely charted from aircraft of the United States Antarctic Service in December 1940. The glacier was mapped in detail by USGS from ground surveys and United States Navy air photos, 1959-66. Named by US-ACAN for Commander William H. Berry, United States Navy, Air Operations Officer for Task Force 43 during Deep Freeze operations 1969-72; Operations Officer, 1973.

=== DeVicq Glacier ===
75°00′S 131°00′W. A large glacier that drains the area between Ames Range and McCuddin Mountains and flows north to enter Getz Ice Shelf to the southeast of Grant Island. Mapped by USGS from surveys and United States Navy air photos, 1959-65. Named by US-ACAN for Lieutenant David C. deVicq, United States Navy, engineering officer in charge of building new Byrd Station, 1960-61.

== Islands and embayments ==
Islands embedded in the ice sheet include, from west to east, Shepard Island, Grant Island, Dean Island, Siple Island, Cherry Island, Carney Island, Nunn Island and Wright Island.

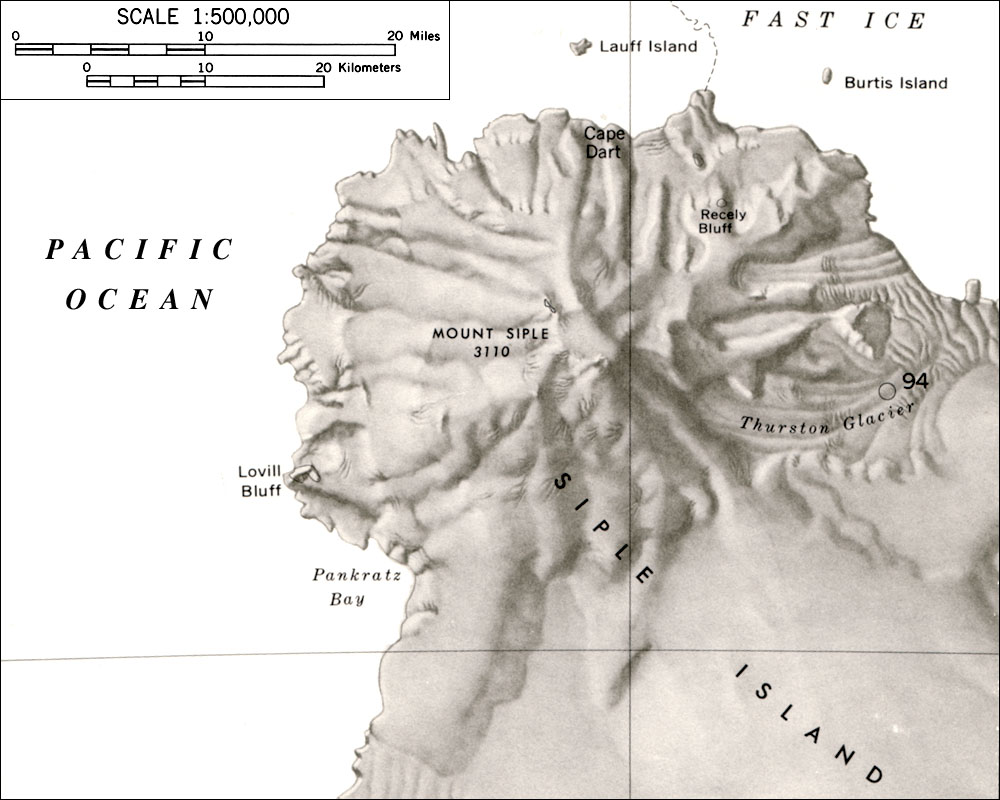
North of Siple Island

From west to east, offshore features include:

=== Wrigley Gulf ===
74°00′S 129°00′W. An embayment about 115 nautical miles (213 km; 132 mi) wide along the coastline of Antarctica, lying seaward of the Getz Ice Shelf. Nearly a right angle in plan, its limits are described by Grant, Dean, and Siple Islands, which are partially or wholly embedded in the ice shelf. Discovered in December 1940 by the US AS. Named for Philip Wrigley, Chicago manufacturer who helped support the expedition.

=== Dean Island ===
74°30′S 127°35′W. An ice-covered island, 20 nautical miles (37 km; 23 mi) long and 10 nautical miles (19 km; 12 mi) wide, lying within the Getz Ice Shelf and midway between Grant Island and Siple Island. First sighted from a distance of 20 nautical miles (37 km; 23 mi) from the USS Glacier on February 5, 1962. Named for Chief Warrant Officer S.L. Dean, United States Navy, Electrical Officer on the Glacier at the time of discovery.

=== Birdwell Point ===
74°18′S 128°10′W. The northwest point of Dean Island. Mapped by USGS from surveys and United States Navy air photos, 1959-65. Named by US-ACAN for Keith W. Birdwell, ET1, United States Navy, Electronics Technician at Byrd Station, 1969.

=== Cole Point ===
74°39′S 127°30′W. Point at the south end of Dean Island. Mapped by USGS from surveys and United States Navy air photos, 1959-65. Named by US-ACAN for Lawrence M. Cole, BU2, United States Navy, Builder at Byrd Station, 1969.

=== Cherry Island ===
73°45′S 123°32′W. An ice-covered island, 3 nautical miles (5.6 km; 3.5 mi) long, lying between Siple and Carney Islands and just within the Getz Ice Shelf. Mapped by USGS from surveys and United States Navy air photos, 1959-66. Named by US-ACAN for Chief Warrant Officer J.M. Cherry, a member of the United States Army Aviation Detachment in Antarctica during United States Navy OpDFrz 1966.

=== Nunn Island ===
74°17′S 117°00′W. An ice-covered island, 9 nautical miles (17 km; 10 mi) long, lying within Getz Ice Shelf just south of Wright Island. Mapped by USGS from surveys and United States Navy air photos, 1959-66. Named by US-ACAN for R. Admiral Ira Nunn, United States Navy, responsible for legal elements of the Navy's Antarctic support during the IGY.

=== Glade Bay ===
73°56′S 115°20′W. An open triangular-shaped bay in Amundsen Sea, 30 nautical miles (56 km; 35 mi) wide at the broad north entrance and defined by the angle formed by the north part of Wright Island, the front of Getz Ice Shelf, and the northwest side of Murray Foreland, Martin Peninsula. Mapped by USGS from surveys and United States Navy aerial photographs, 1959-67. Named by US-ACAN after Commander Gerald L. Glade, United States Navy, helicopter pilot in USS Atka on United States Navy OpDFrz, 1956–57; Deputy Commander, Naval Support Force, Antarctica, 1975-76.

== Coastal features ==
From west to east, coastal features include:

=== Bakutis Coast ===
74°45′S 120°00′W. That part of the coast of Antarctica extending from a point opposite eastern Dean Island, at 74°42′S 127°05′W, to Cape Herlacher. The coast in this area is bounded by several large ice-covered islands and the very extensive Getz Ice Shelf. This coast was sighted by members of the USAS, 1939–41, and was charted in part from air photos taken by United States Navy OpHjp, 1946–47, both expeditions led by Admiral R.E. Byrd. The USGS completely mapped the coast from'ground surveys and United States Navy air photos, 1959-66. Named by US-ACAN for R. Admiral Fred E. Bakutis, Commander of the United States Naval Support Force, Antarctica, from 1965 to 1967.

=== Scott Peninsula ===
74°22′S 117°58′W. An ice-covered peninsula, 17 nautical miles (31 km; 20 mi) long, extending from the coast into the Getz Ice Shelf toward the west end of Wright Island. Mapped by USGS from surveys and United States Navy air photos, 1959-66. Named by US-ACAN for Lieutenant Colonel Thomas Scott, United States Army, who assisted with the early establishment of United States Navy OpDFrz finances and liaison during the IGY.

=== Brennan Inlet ===
74°28′S 116°35′W. An ice-filled inlet in the southeast part of Getz Ice Shelf, bounded to the west by Scott Peninsula and Nunn Island and to the east by Spaulding Peninsula. Named by US-ACAN after Lieutenant Commander Lawrence A. Brennan, United States Navy Reserve, who helped plan and execute the recovery of three damaged LC-130 aircraft from Dome Charlie (q.v.) in East Antarctica, successfully accomplished in the 1975–76 and 1976-77 seasons.

=== Spaulding Peninsula ===
74°26′S 116°00′W. A low ice-covered peninsula west of Martin Peninsula, extending 7 nautical miles (13 km; 8.1 mi) into Getz Ice Shelf between Brennan Inlet and Sweeny Inlet. Mapped by USGS from surveys and United States Navy aerial photographs, 1959-67. Named by US-ACAN in 1977 after PRC Richard L. Spauiding, United States Navy, parachute-rescue team leader, Operation Deep Freeze 1977, during which, over South Pole Station, he made his 1,000th career jump. He made over 110 Antarctic jumps in his nine Deep Freeze seasonal deployments through 1977.

=== Sweeny Inlet ===
74°27′S 115°20′W. An ice-filled inlet, 18 nautical miles (33 km; 21 mi) wide, between Spaulding Peninsula and Martin Peninsula on Bakutis Coast. The feature marks the southeast end of Getz Ice Shelf. Mapped by USGS from surveys and United States Navy aerial photographs, 1959-67. Named by US-ACAN after Captain Timothy A. Sweeny, (CE) United States Army, officer in charge of the aircraft recovery camp at Dome Charlie (q.v.) on United States Navy OpDFrz, 1976. Working at this remote camp in the 1975-76 season, the salvage team succeeded in recovering two LC-130 aircraft which had been damaged at Dome Charlie on January 15, 1975, and November 4, 1975.

== Sources ==
- Alberts, Fred G., ed. (1995), Geographic Names of the Antarctic (PDF) (2 ed.), United States Board on Geographic Names This article incorporates public domain material from websites or documents of the United States Board on Geographic Names.
- U. S. Board on Geographic Names; Water Resources Division, U. S. Geological Survey; Defense Mapping Agency; National Science Foundation (1995), Alberts, Fred G. (ed.), "Geographic Names of the Antarctic" (PDF), USGS Report (2 ed.), United States Board on Geographic Names: 3, Bibcode:1995usgs.rept....3U This article incorporates public domain material from websites or documents of the United States Board on Geographic Names.
- Dean Island, USGS: United States Geological Survey, 1976
- Grant Island, USGS: United States Geological Survey, 1974
- This article incorporates public domain material from websites or documents of the United States Geological Survey.
