= Siple Island =

Island in Marie Byrd Land, Antarctica

Siple
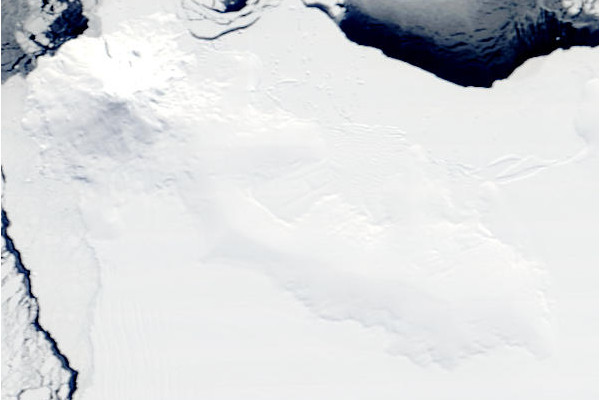
- October 2002 satellite photograph of Siple Island

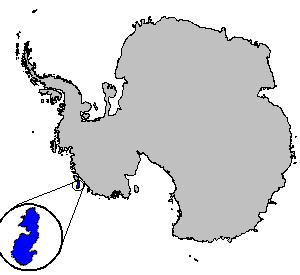
- Location of Siple Island

Geography
- Location: Western Antarctica
- Coordinates: 73°51′S 125°50′W
- Area: 6,390 km^{2} (2,470 sq mi)
- Area rank: 100th
- Length: 110 km (68 mi)
- Highest elevation: 3,110 m (10200 ft)
- Highest point: Mount Siple

Administration
- Administered under the Antarctic Treaty System

Demographics
- Population: Uninhabited

Siple Island (/ˈsaɪpəl/ SIGH-p'l) is a 110 km (68 mi) long snow-covered island lying east of Wrigley Gulf along the Getz Ice Shelf off Bakutis Coast of Marie Byrd Land, Antarctica. Its centre is located at 73°51′S 125°50′W.

Its area is 6,390 km^{2} (2,467 sq mi) and it is dominated by the dormant shield volcano Mount Siple, rising to 3,110 m (10,203 ft) — making Siple the 15th ranking island in the world in terms of maximum elevation.

The feature was first indicated as an island on U.S. Geological Survey (USGS) maps compiled from ground surveys and U.S. Navy air photos, 1959–65. The island was visited by USCG Icebreaker, Polar Sea, in 1984 during Operation Deep Freeze. USCG serviceman, James F. Woodruff, was first to record footing on the island.

The island and the mountain were named by the United States Advisory Committee on Antarctic Names (US-ACAN) in 1967 in honour of the American Antarctic explorer Paul A. Siple (1909–1968), a member of Admiral Byrd's expeditions.

== Geographic features ==
- The Blob - mound-shaped knoll
- Recely Bluff - bluff on northeast slope of Mount Siple.

== See also ==
- Composite Antarctic Gazetteer
- List of Antarctic and sub-Antarctic islands
- List of Antarctic islands south of 60° S
- List of volcanoes in Antarctica
- Scientific Committee on Antarctic Research
- Territorial claims in Antarctica
