= Jerauld Wright =

United States Navy admiral (1898–1995)

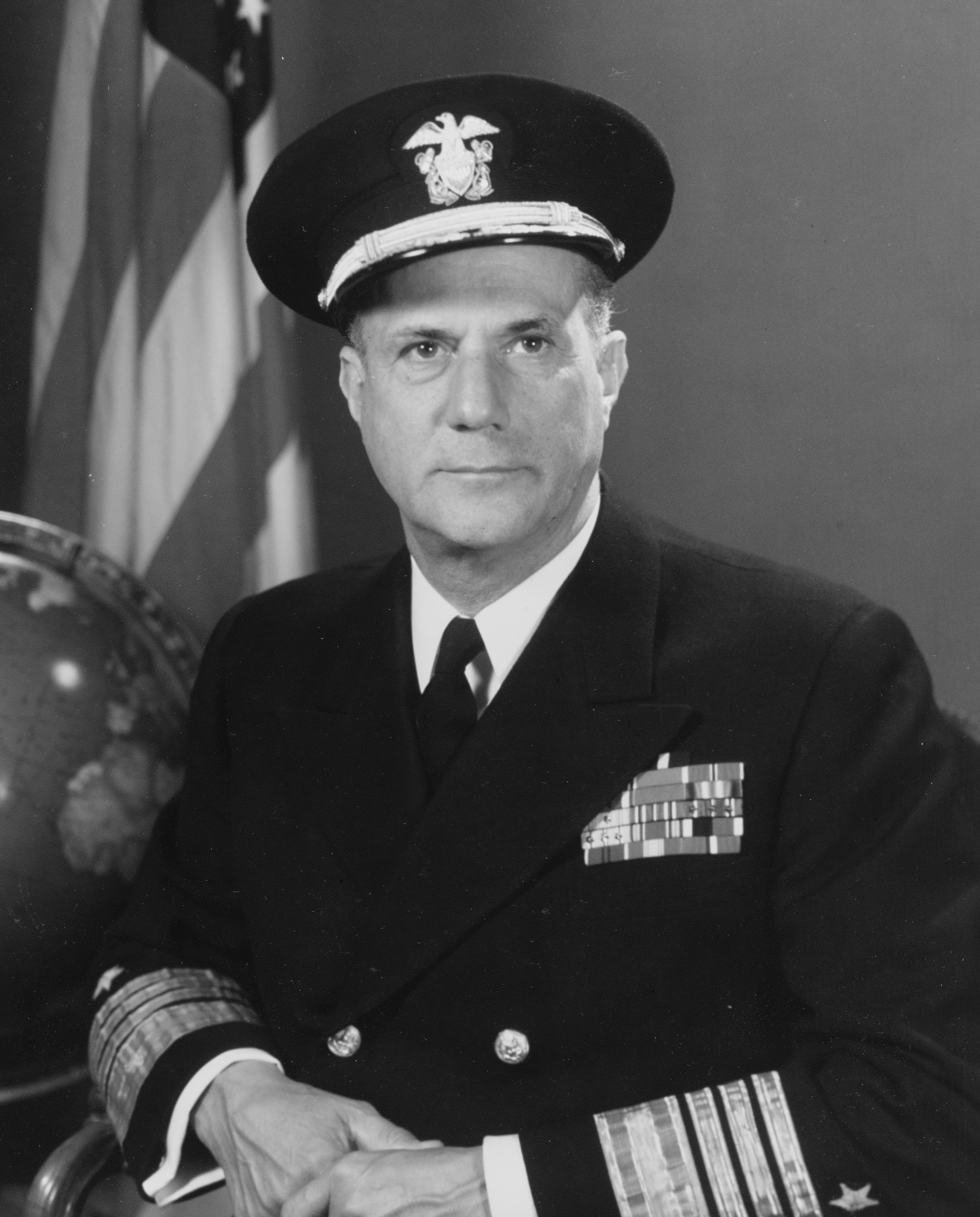
- Official portrait of Admiral Jerauld Wright

United States Ambassador to Taiwan
- In office June 29, 1963 – July 25, 1965
- President: John F. Kennedy; Lyndon B. Johnson
- Preceded by: Alan Goodrich Kirk
- Succeeded by: Walter P. McConaughy

Personal details
- Born: June 4, 1898 Amherst, Massachusetts, US
- Died: April 27, 1995 (aged 96) Washington, D.C., US
- Resting place: Arlington National Cemetery
- Parent: William M. Wright (father)
- Nickname(s): Jerry; Old Iron Heels; Old Stoneface; El Supremo

Military service
- Allegiance: United States
- Branch/service: United States Navy
- Years of service: 1917–1960
- Rank: Admiral
- Commands: Allied Command Atlantic; United States Atlantic Command; United States Atlantic Fleet; United States Naval Forces Eastern Atlantic and Mediterranean; Amphibious Forces Atlantic Fleet; Cruiser Division Six; Amphibious Group Five; USS Santa Fe; USS Blue
- Battles/wars: World War I World War II: Operation Torch; Operation Husky; Operation Avalanche; Operation Flintlock; Operation Cartwheel; Operation Reckless; Operation Persecution; Operation Forager; Battle of the Philippine Sea; Battle of Leyte Gulf; Operation Iceberg
- Awards: Navy Distinguished Service Medal (2); Silver Star; Legion of Merit (2); Bronze Star Medal

Admiral Jerauld Wright (June 4, 1898 – April 27, 1995) was an officer in the United States Navy. He served as the Commander-in-Chief of the United States Atlantic Command (CINCLANT) and the Commander-in-Chief of the United States Atlantic Fleet (CINCLANTFLT), and became the second Supreme Allied Commander Atlantic (SACLANT) for the North Atlantic Treaty Organization (NATO), from April 1, 1954, to March 1, 1960, serving longer in these three positions than anyone else in history.

Following World War I, Wright served as a naval aide for Presidents Calvin Coolidge and Herbert Hoover. A recognized authority on naval gunnery, Wright served in the European and Pacific theaters during World War II, developing expertise in amphibious warfare and coalition warfare planning. After the war, Wright was involved in the evolution of the military structure of NATO as well as overseeing the modernization and readiness of the United States Atlantic Fleet during the Cold War.

Upon his retirement from the navy, Wright subsequently served on the Central Intelligence Agency's National Board of Estimates (NBE) and as the United States Ambassador to the Republic of China (Taiwan).

== Early years ==
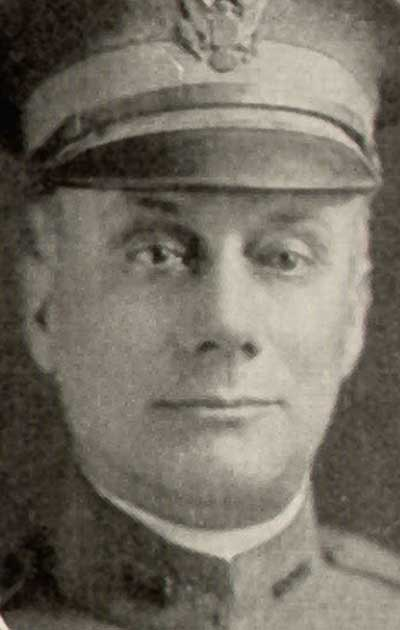
Major General William M. Wright

Jerauld Wright was born on June 4, 1898, in Amherst, Massachusetts, the second son of Major General William M. Wright (1863–1943), an officer in the United States Army, and the former Marjorie R. Jerauld (1867–1954), who also had another son, William Mason Wright, Jr. (1893–1977), and a daughter, Marjorie Wright (1900–1985).

Life for young Jerry Wright was a succession of United States Army posts, such as Fort Porter, Fort Omaha, the Presidio, and the Jefferson Barracks, as well as overseas tours of duty in Cuba and the Philippines. Keeping the family together while his father pursued an active military career was his mother, nicknamed "The Field Marshal" by her husband. Jerry remembered his mother fondly: "She was a tiger with her young."

Wright's father was a veteran of the Spanish–American War, the Boxer Rebellion, and World War I, during which he commanded the 89th Division in the St. Mihiel offensive and the Third Corps. He was a recipient of the Army Distinguished Service Medal. Following the war, General Wright commanded the Ninth Corps at the Presidio and the Department of the Philippines. While his father was assigned to the newly created United States Army General Staff before World War I, Wright met William Howard Taft. Later, Wright accompanied his father on inspection tours of U.S. military installations in the Philippines. During this tour, he was deeply impressed by the naval squadron visiting Manila. His growing interest in a naval career was further encouraged by his father, giving his son a very practical perspective:

Take a good look at the Navy. Soldiers have to tramp miles, sleep in the mud, eat cold rations, and live for days in wet clothes. Sailors have warm bunks, eat hot meals, and wear dry socks every day.

Prior to going to the United States Naval Academy in Annapolis, Maryland, Wright attended the Franciscan Coligio de La Salle in Malate, California, and Shadman's School at Scott's Circle in Washington, DC.

=== United States Naval Academy ===
Wright received an appointment to the United States Naval Academy from Congressman Edward W. Townsend of the Tenth Congressional District from the State of New Jersey. Wright entered the academy on July 31, 1914, the youngest midshipman to enter the academy since the American Civil War. Wright graduated on June 26, 1917, as part of the Class of 1918, ranked 92nd out of 193, the youngest member in his class.

== Naval career ==
=== World War I ===
In July 1917, Lieutenant Wright joined the gunboat USS Castine, which set sail for Gibraltar on August 5, 1917, for anti-submarine patrol and convoy duty, operating as a unit of the Patrol Force through December 21, 1918.

=== Inter-war service ===
==== Sea duty ====
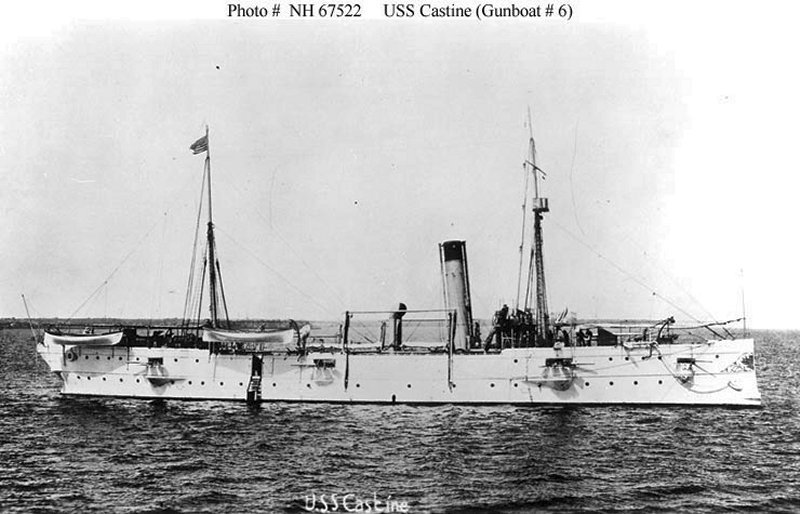
USS Castine

Wright served on USS Dyer, a Wickes-class destroyer, as a watch and division officer from December 1918 to July 1920. Dyer showed the flag in port visits to Gibraltar, La Spezia, Venice, Trieste, Spoleto, Corfu, and Constantinople during a nine-month cruise of the Mediterranean following the signing of the Armistice ending World War I. Following Dyer's return August 1919, Wright supervised her overhaul at the Brooklyn Navy Yard. Lt. Wright also briefly commanded the Paul Jones, a Clemson-class destroyer, which escorted the presidential yacht Mayflower, with President Warren G. Harding on board, from Gardiner's Bay, New York, to the Capes. In October 1920, Lt. Wright took command of USS Reid, Clemson-class destroyer anchored in reserve at Naval Station Newport, Rhode Island, for transfer to Charleston, South Carolina. Later, in February 1922, Lt. Wright joined USS Breese, a Wickes-class destroyer slated for decommissioning at the Mare Island Navy Yard, serving as its executive officer.

In June 1922, Wright joined USS John D. Ford, a Clemson-class destroyer, as its executive officer, with additional duties as fire control officer and navigator. John D. Ford set sail from the Philadelphia Navy Yard with its sister ships of Squadron 15, Division 3, for the U.S. Asiatic Fleet. The John D. Ford operated throughout the Far East, including the South China Sea, the Sea of Japan, and the Philippines, showing the flag and training with other destroyers in the fleet. In July 1926, Lt. Wright joined the USS Maryland, a Colorado-class battleship, as the principal assistant of the ship's Gunnery Division. In November 1928, the Maryland took President-elect Herbert Hoover on the outbound leg of his goodwill tour of Latin America. Wright also furthered his hands-on education of gunnery and ordnance while serving as an instructor at the Gunnery School on the battleship Colorado. Commander Wright joined USS Salt Lake City, a Pensacola-class cruiser attached to the Scouting Force, as its first lieutenant in August 1931 and later became the ship's gunnery officer from June 1932 to June 1934. The Salt Lake City participated in naval exercises in the Atlantic and Pacific, underwent a major overhaul and participated in the 1934 Naval Review.

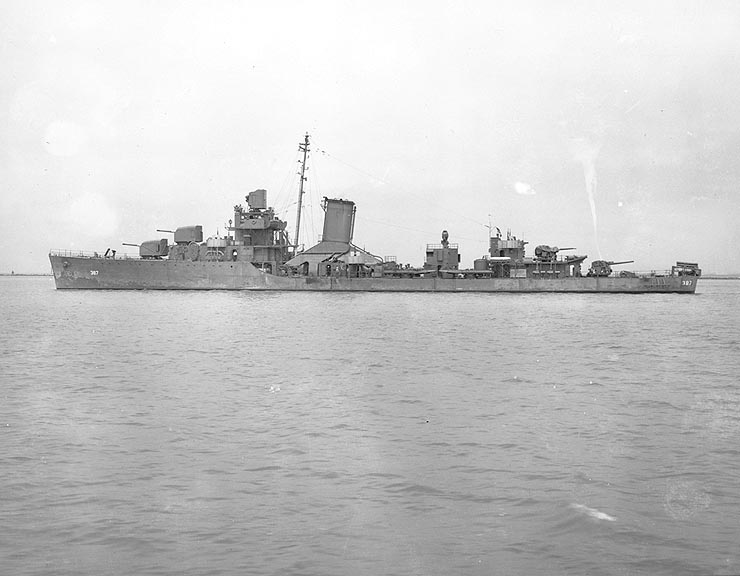
USS Blue

Wright's first sea command was USS Blue, a Bagley-class destroyer, with Wright serving as its first commanding officer from July 1937 to May 1939. The Blue completed its shakedown cruise, transited the Panama Canal, and joined the Destroyer Division 7 (DesRon 7) as its flagship, becoming a unit of the Battle Force based at the San Diego Naval Base, California. The Blue participated in Fleet Problem XX exercises staged in the Caribbean Sea.

Wright's final pre-war sea assignment was as the executive officer of USS Mississippi, a New Mexico-class battleship, from March 1941 to May 1942. The Mississippi was based at the Pearl Harbor Naval Base in the Territory of Hawaii until May 1941 as part of Battleship Division 3 (BatDiv 3) with sister ships New Mexico and Idaho. Following the Bismarck incident and the growing U-boat threat, Battleship Division 3 was secretly shifted to the newly reconstituted U.S. Atlantic Fleet, under the command of Admiral Ernest J. King, entering the Norfolk Naval Base in June 1941. Mississippi was present at the Atlantic Conference at Argentia, participated in the Neutrality Patrol, and joined the Idaho and the British battleship HMS King George V to form an Iceland-based fleet in being to deter the German battleship Tirpitz from deploying into the north Atlantic to threaten Allied convoys. After months of operations in the North Atlantic, Mississippi was en route to Norfolk for long overdue repairs two days after the Japanese attacked Pearl Harbor on December 7, 1941.

==== Shore duty ====
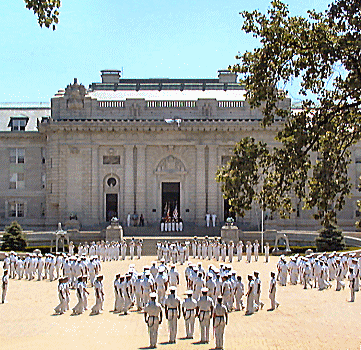
Bancroft Hall – U.S. Naval Academy

Wright served as a naval aide for two Presidents of the United States, including Calvin Coolidge from September 1924 to June 1926, with additional duties as a watch and division officer on board the presidential yacht Mayflower, and Herbert Hoover during his pre-inaugural goodwill tour of Latin America in November 1928. Wright also served as aide to Assistant Secretary of the Navy Henry L. Roosevelt from June 1935 to March 1936. Wright subsequently served on board Sequoia during its commissioning and fitting-out period.

Wright developed an interest in gunnery and ordnance after he was turned down for naval aviation because he had exophoria. His first tour of duty at the Bureau of Ordnance (BuOrd) was as a fire control section assistant, specializing in anti-aircraft equipment, from August 1929 to August 1931. Wright's second BuOrd assignment was with its supply and allowance division, involving ammunition distribution to the fleet, from June 1936 to July 1937. Bureau chief Rear Admiral Harold R. Stark rated Wright highly.

Commander Wright served two tours at the United States Naval Academy as the Battalion Commander for the First Battalion, from June 1934 to June 1935, and the Battalion Commander for the Second Battalion, from June 1939 to March 1941. Wright earned two nicknames at the Naval Academy. The first, Old Iron Heels because he wore steel wedges on his shoes to alert midshipmen of his approach. His second nickname, Old Stoneface originated because of his ability to elicit confessions from offending midshipmen regarding disciplinary infractions without uttering a word. Wright also served as the staff aide to the Commander Atlantic Squadron during the Midshipman's Practice Cruise in June–August 1940.

=== World War II ===
==== Pearl Harbor aftermath, COMINCH, and London ====
The USS Mississippi completed its overhaul in three weeks and transited the Panama Canal to re-join the U.S. Pacific Fleet, visiting San Francisco, California to re-assure its citizens in the aftermath of the attack on Pearl Harbor. In March 1942, Captain Jerauld Wright was detached from the Mississippi for temporary duty on the staff of Admiral Ernest J. King, the Commander-in-Chief of the U.S. Fleet (COMINCH), before being assigned to Admiral Harold R. Stark's staff in London, effective June 3, 1942. Captain Wright was subsequently assigned to the planning staff of Lieutenant General Dwight D. Eisenhower, who would lead the British-American invasion of North Africa (Operation Torch). Wright's role would be to coordinate with his British counterparts regarding the Mediterranean landings in Algiers.

One growing concern for Eisenhower and his planners was the likely reaction of local French political and military leaders toward an Allied invasion of North Africa. Strong French resistance could cause more casualties for the landing force. One issue coloring French attitudes was their deep-seated resentment toward the British for the Attack on Mers-el-Kébir in which the Royal Navy shelled the anchored French fleet in June 1940. Another issue was working with officials connected to the Vichy government which could cause serious political and security complications. Diplomat Robert D. Murphy, the U.S. consul general in Algiers, spearheaded efforts to gather pre-invasion intelligence and cultivate diplomatic contacts in French North Africa, and Wright would find himself intimately involved in his pre-invasion activities.

==== North Africa, Sicily, and Italy ====
===== Operation Flagpole =====
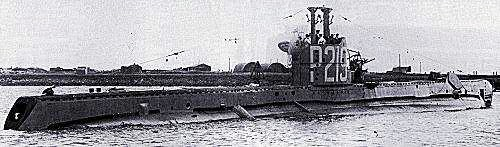
HMS Seraph

On October 16, 1942, Captain Jerauld Wright was summoned to Operation Torch's staff headquarters at Norfolk House in London for an important meeting with General Eisenhower, alongside other senior officers. Eisenhower informed the group that the War Department had forwarded an urgent cable from U.S. diplomat Robert D. Murphy requesting the immediate dispatch of a top-secret high-level group to meet with Général Charles E. Mast, the military commander of Algiers and the leader of a group of pro-Allied officials in French North Africa.

The objective of this secret mission, code-named Operation Flagpole, was to reach an agreement through Mast and his colleagues to have Général Henri Giraud, a key pro-Allied French army officer, step forward, take command of French military forces in North Africa, and then arrange a ceasefire with the Allied invasion force. Other alternatives, like Jean Darlan and Charles de Gaulle, had been rejected by the British and American governments for a variety of political reasons. Clark would be Eisenhower's personal representative, with Lemnitzer as the top invasion planner, Hamblen as the invasion's logistics expert, and Holmes serving as translator. Wright would serve as the liaison with the French Navy, with the specific objective of convincing the French to have their fleet anchored in Toulon join the Allied cause.

The group flew in two Boeing B-17 Flying Fortress bombers to Gibraltar, and on October 19, they boarded the British submarine HMS Seraph, Lieutenant Norman Limbury Auchinleck "Bill" Jewell, RN, commanding. Seraph then transported Clark's party to the small fishing village of Cherchell, located 82 mils (132 kilometers) west of Algiers. After midnight on the evening of October 21, the Seraph surfaced and set Clark's mission ashore, where they met with Mast and Murphy. Wright met with Capitaine de vaisseau Jean Barjot and learned that the French Navy was opposed to U.S. entry into North Africa, although the army and air force supported it.

On October 24, Clark's mission returned to the Seraph and later met a seaplane that flew them back to Gibraltar, arriving back in London on October 25 where Wright briefed Admiral Stark. Both Eisenhower and Clark recommended Jerauld Wright for a Distinguished Service Medal in recognition for his role in Operation Flagpole. Wright's DSM was personally pinned by Admiral Ernest J. King, the Chief of Naval Operations, during the Casablanca Conference.

===== Operation Kingpin =====
With the preliminaries concluded during Operation Flagpole, the next task was to free Général Giraud (code-named Kingpin) whom the Vichy government had under house arrest for his anti-Nazi leanings at Toulon in southern France. On October 26, 1942, Captain Jerauld Wright was directed to take part in the mission to extract Giraud, code-named Operation Kingpin. Because of intense anti-British sentiment among French officers, the mission would present an American face. However, because there were no American submarines operating in the Mediterranean Sea, a novel solution was conceived with Wright taking command of the British submarine HMS Seraph. As Captain G. B. H. Fawkes, RN, the commander of 8th Submarine Flotilla in the Mediterranean, noted:

It was, I think, unique in the history of the two nations that a United States Naval officer should be placed in nominal command of a British submarine thereby making her the only warship on active duty to be commanded by two captains.

The Seraph got underway on October 27 and arrived off Toulon on October 30. After several delays, Giraud and his party were brought on board, and a PBY Catalina flying boat subsequently flew Wright, Giraud, and the others back to Gibraltar, the new Operation Torch headquarters, to confer with generals Eisenhower and Clark. Captain Jerauld Wright was awarded his first Legion of Merit in recognition of his participation in Operation Kingpin.

===== Operation Torch =====
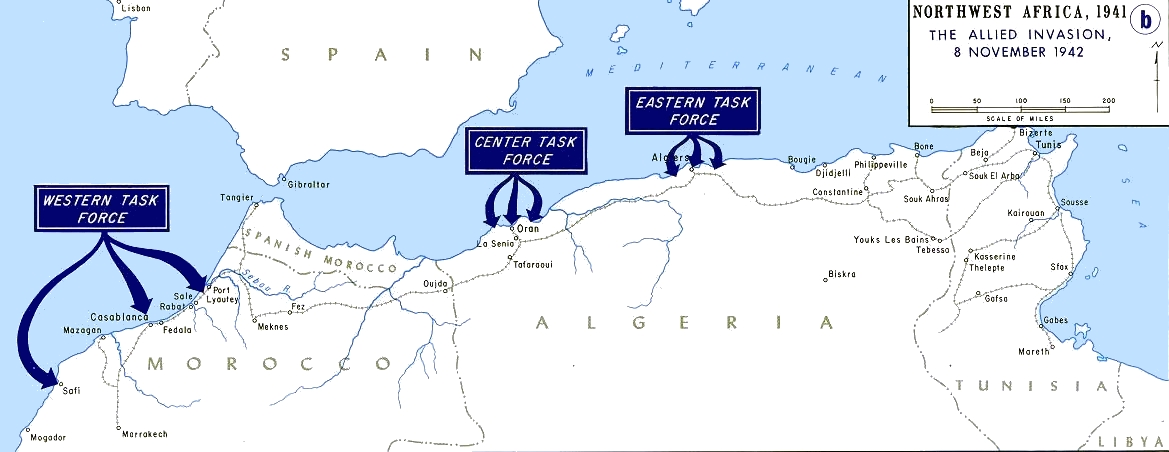
Operation Torch landing zones

D-Day for Operation Torch, November 8, 1942, saw over 73,000 American and British troops landed at Casablanca, Oran, and Algiers. However, the most significant development was on the diplomatic and political front when U.S. consul general Robert D. Murphy alerted the Allied high command about the unexpected presence of Admiral de la flotte Jean Darlan, the head of the Vichy French military, who was visiting his ill son in Algiers. Darlan's presence complicated the pre-invasion arrangements with Général Henri Giraud. Darlan pointed out to Murphy that he outranked Giraud, whom Darlan maintained had little influence within the French military.

After a ceasefire was reached in Algiers, General Eisenhower sent a delegation to resolve the situation and broker a ceasefire with all French North African forces. Captain Jerauld Wright accompanied General Clark, who concluded that Darlan could, with certain conditions, deliver the general ceasefire and oversee the post-invasion occupation, and that Giraud lacked the political ability to accomplish these goals. Eisenhower endorsed Clark's recommendation, which caused a political firestorm within the Allied governments because of Darlan's connection to Vichy. About Giraud and Darlan, Wright observed:

Unfortunately, his stubbornness prevented him [Giraud] from being any help on D-day toward negotiating a ceasefire throughout French territory. Because of an extraordinary coincidence [Darlan], his cooperation might not have made a difference anyway.

Admiral Harold R. Stark noted in Wright's December 1942 fitness report that:

An officer of great ability, whose calm, assured habit of command inspires confidence alike in seniors and subordinates. Excellent personal and military character. Has performed two outstanding dangerous and secret missions. ... Qualified for Flag rank.

At the Casablanca Conference in January 1943, President Franklin D. Roosevelt, Prime Minister Winston Churchill, and the Combined Chiefs of Staff (CCS) made the decision to shelve plans for Operation Sledgehammer, and instead progress operations in Sicily (Operation Husky) and Italy (Operation Avalanche). Finally, Admiral Darlan was assassinated on December 24, 1942, and Charles de Gaulle would ultimately outmaneuver and marginalize Henri Giraud to become the sole leader of the Free French movement.

===== Operation Husky =====
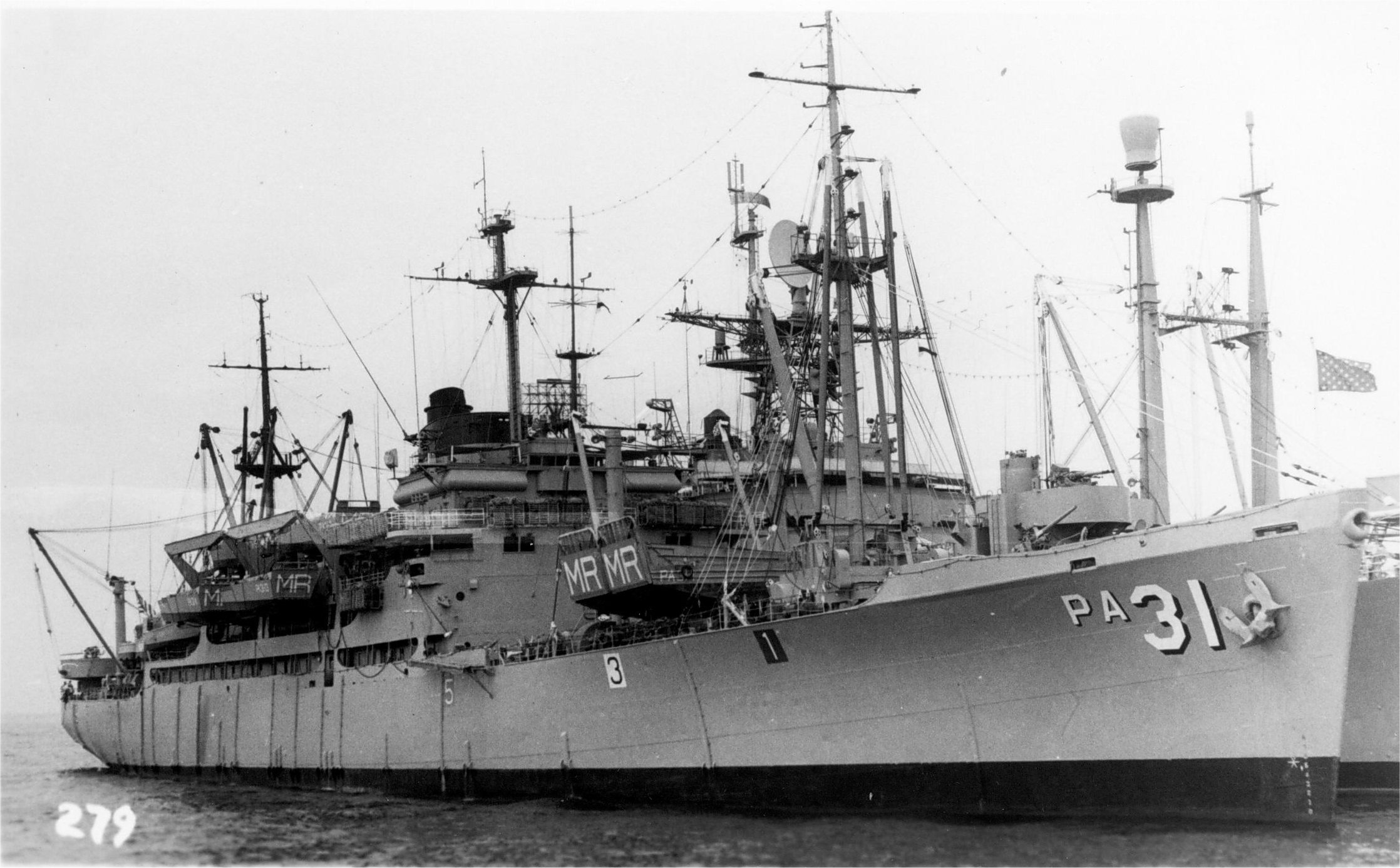
USS Monrovia

Wright joined the staff of Vice Admiral H. Kent Hewitt, the Commander, U.S. Naval Forces, Northwest Africa Waters (COMNAVNAW), as its assistant chief of staff.

Hewitt would command the "Western Naval Task Force", which would land U.S. Seventh Army under Lieutenant General George S. Patton in the Gulf of Gela for Operation Husky, the Allied invasion of Sicily. Vice Admiral Sir Bertram Ramsay, RN, would command the Eastern Naval Task Force, which would land the British Eighth Army under General Sir Bernard Montgomery near Syracuse. Admiral Sir Andrew Cunningham, RN, would command all Allied naval forces for Operation Husky, and General Dwight D. Eisenhower, United States Army, would be in overall command of the Sicily invasion.

The Western Naval Task Force consisted of three subordinated forces, Task Force 80 (code name JOSS) under the command of Rear Admiral Richard L. Conolly was to land the 3rd Infantry Division, Major General Lucian Truscott commanding, on beaches near Licata. Task Force 82 (code name DIME) under Rear Admiral John L. Hall, Jr. was to land 1st Infantry Division, Major General Terry de la Mesa Allen commanding, on beaches near Gela. Task Force 85 (code name CENT) under the command of Rear Admiral Alan Kirk was to land the 45th Infantry Division, Major General Troy Middleton commanding, on beaches near Scoglitti.

Wright worked closely with his U.S. Army counterparts, and he considered Patton "a great fellow" who grew to appreciate the effectiveness of naval gun support for his landing force. However, Wright was critical of Lieutenant General Carl A. Spaatz, USAAF, and Air Vice-Marshal Sir Arthur Coningham, RAF, regarding the lack of cooperation on close air support from the Allied air forces. Wright did praise Air Vice-Marshal Sir Hugh Pughe Lloyd, RAF, for providing air support from Malta.

The loading of ships and landing craft of the Western Naval Task Force was completed on July 8, 1943, with Vice Admiral Hewitt and his staff embarking on the USS Monrovia, the invasion force's flagship. D-Day was July 10, and Patton's troops stormed ashore and began their history-making drive for Messina.

===== Operation Avalanche =====
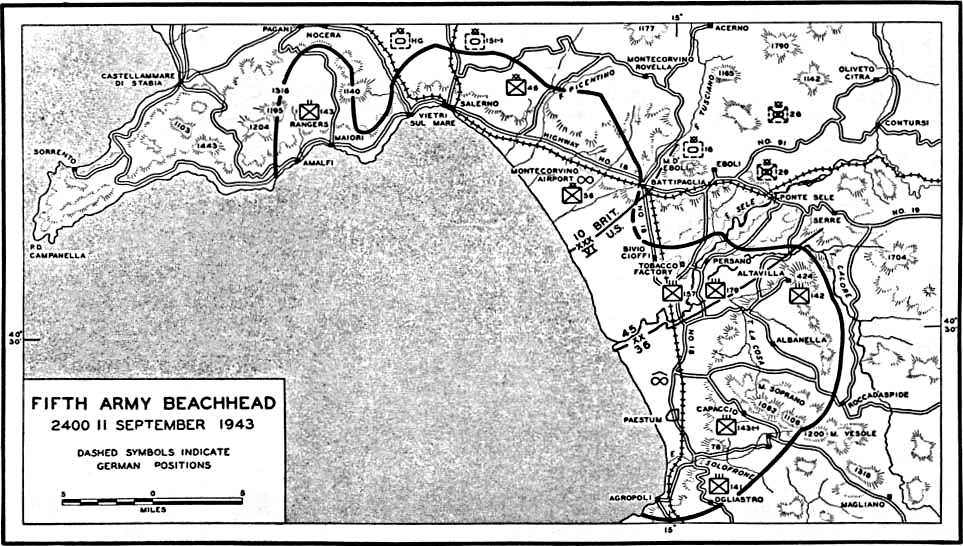
Operation Avalanche – Salerno bridgehead at the end of September 11, 1943

Operation Avalanche was the Allied invasion of the Italian mainland with amphibious landings at Salerno, with additional landing at Calabria (Operation Baytown) and Taranto (Operation Slapstick).

For the Salerno landing, Wright faced two major challenges in his capacity as the assistant chief of staff for U.S. Naval Forces, Northwest Africa Waters (NAVNAW), namely the shortage of U.S. escort vessels and a shortage of landing craft. While Wright was able to secure additional British escorts, landing craft would remain a persistent problem given the competing demands from Operation Overlord and the Pacific Theater of Operations, with Wright noting: "LST's don't grow on trees." On the other hand, two developments were welcomed by Wright and his fellow invasion planners, including U.S. escort aircraft carriers (CVE) which would provide much needed off-shore close air support for the landing force, and the news that Major General E. J. House would oversee tactical air support for the ground forces using aircraft from the Northwest African Air Force. However, Wright felt that the Army's decision to forgo pre-invasion naval gun bombardment was ill-considered, even for the sake of maintaining the element of surprise.

The invasion force got underway, with Vice Admiral H. Kent Hewitt, Wright, and the NAVNAW staff embarked on the USS Ancon, Hewitt's flagship for Operation Avalanche. While en route, Wright heard the announcement about the Armistice with Italy by General Dwight D. Eisenhower, the supreme allied commander, on September 9. While this removed the Italian military from the battlefield, German Army forces in Italy under Generalfeldmarschall Albert Kesselring were not bound by this agreement. The immediate objective for Operation Avalanche was to secure the Gulf of Salerno and capture Naples.

September 9, 1943 was D-Day for Operation Avalanche as the 36th Infantry Division, under the command of Major General Fred L. Walker USA, stormed ashore at Salerno under heavy fire from German tanks, artillery, and machine guns. During the landings, on the morning of September 11, Wright witnessed a radio-controlled flying bomb severely damage USS Savannah, a Brooklyn-class cruiser light cruiser. A powerful German counter-attack on September 13 threatened to drive a wedge into the Salerno bridgehead, but it was beaten back by a powerful Allied air-land-sea assault, forcing a German retreat. With the Fifth U.S. Army under Lieutenant General Mark Clark driving for Naples, Admiral Hewitt and Wright returned to Malta to give a full report on Operation Avalanche to General Eisenhower. Captain Jerauld Wright was awarded a second Legion of Merit for his contributions on Operation Husky and Operation Avalanche.

==== Central Pacific ====
===== USS Santa Fe (CL-60) =====
Battle of the Philippine Sea

In October 1943, Captain Jerauld Wright was detached from U.S. Naval Forces, Northwest Africa Waters (NAVNAW) to take command of USS Santa Fe, a Cleveland-class light cruiser nicknamed the "Lucky Lady." Wright relieved Captain Russell S. Berkey on December 15, 1943. Santa Fe was the flagship of Cruiser Division 13, Rear Admiral Laurance T. DuBose commanding, which also included USS Birmingham, Mobile, and Reno. During December 1943, Santa Fe underwent amphibious training off San Pedro, California.

On January 13, 1944, Santa Fe set sail from California for the Marshall Islands, as part of the invasion force for Operation Flintlock. Santa Fe served as an escort for the Northern Attack Force (Task Force 53), Rear Admiral Richard L. Conolly commanding, which was tasked to capture Roi-Namur and the northern half of the Kwajalein atoll. Santa Fe joined the bombardment force (Task Group 53.5), Rear Admiral Jesse B. Oldendorf commanding, that provided naval gunfire support for U.S. Marine landing forces at Kwajalein which was secured on February 4.

Following a lay-over at Majuro, Santa Fe participated in air raids against Truk and Saipan as part of Task Force 58 during February 1944. Wright received a Letter of Commendation for his actions as the commanding officer of the Santa Fe during this engagement. From March 15 through May 1, 1944, Santa Fe was part of Task Group 58.2, Rear Admiral Joseph J. Clark commanding, which provided air support for amphibious landings at Emirau Island and Hollandia while also participating in air raids against Japanese garrisons on Palau, Yap, Wakde, Woleai, Satawan, and Ponape, as well as major air strike against the Japanese naval base at Truk. Santa Fe also participated in the shore bombardment of Wakde Airfield and Sawar Airfield.

On June 15, 1944, Santa Fe participated in landings on Saipan, Guam, and Tinian (Operation Forager) as a part of the United States Fifth Fleet under the overall command of Vice Admiral Raymond A. Spruance. On June 19, Japanese carrier aircraft began attacking the Fifth Fleet which remained close to the beachhead on orders from Spruance. Wright concurred that this controversial decision was the correct one given the importance of protecting the landing force. During the ensuing Battle of the Philippine Sea, Santa Fe's anti-aircraft guns helped to protect the fleet during these enemy air attacks while American naval aviators counter-attacked the Japanese fleet. Later, on June 20, Santa Fe ignored possible Japanese submarine activity when she turned on her lights to help guide returning American aircraft back to their carriers during highly hazardous night landings. After air strikes on Pagan Island, Santa Fe returned to Eniwetok for reprovisioning.

In August, Santa Fe joined Task Group 38.3, Rear Admiral Frederick C. Sherman commanding, for the invasion of Peleliu and Angaur (Operation Stalemate II) as part of the United States Third Fleet under the overall command of Admiral William F. Halsey, and carrier air attacks to neutralize Japanese air bases on Babelthuap and Koro in preparation for the upcoming Philippines campaign led by General Douglas MacArthur. During air raids on Formosa in October, the heavy cruiser Canberra and light cruiser Houston were seriously damaged by aerial torpedoes. Santa Fe was part of a covering force (Task Force 30.3), nicknamed "CripDiv 1," formed to protect the damaged cruisers as they were being towed back for Ulithi for repairs. The final engagements that Wright participated in as the commanding officer of USS Santa Fe were the invasion of Leyte and the Battle of Leyte Gulf. Captain Jerauld Wright received the Silver Star in recognition of his participation in the towing of the Canberra and Houston back to Uliti.

===== Amphibious Group Five =====
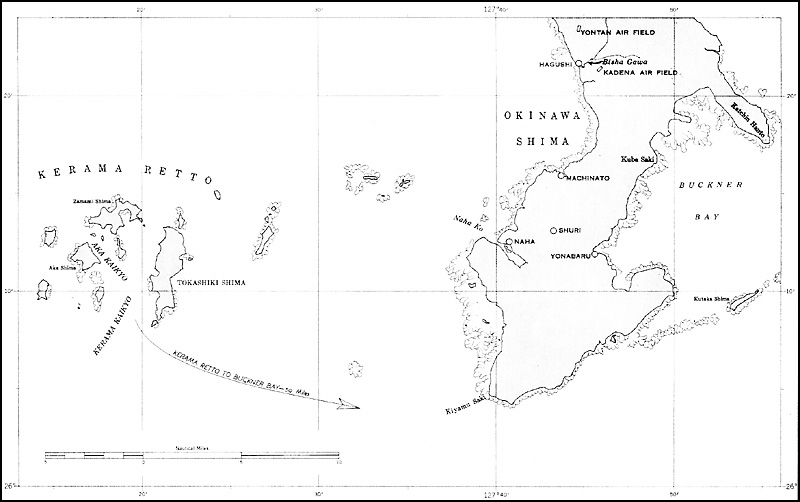
Operation Iceberg – Kerama Retto (1945)

In November 1944, Rear Admiral Wright took command of Amphibious Group Five, a newly created unit of the Amphibious Forces, U.S. Pacific Fleet, commanded by Vice Admiral Richmond Kelly Turner. Wright's group would be involved in the invasion of the Ryukyu Islands (Operation Iceberg), the island of Okinawa being the key objective. Once taken, U.S. forces would use Okinawa as a staging area for the eventual invasion of Japan, and a base for the B-29 Superfortress bombers of the U.S. Seventh Air Force to attack the Japanese home islands. Amphibious Group Five would transport the 2nd Marine Division, Major General Thomas E. Watson, USMC, commanding, with Wright flying his flag from USS Ancon (AGC-4).

For Operation Iceberg, Wright's force was designated Demonstration Group Charlie (Task Group 51.2), whose mission was to serve as a decoy force working in conjunction with the Southern Attack Force (Task Force 55) commanded by Rear Admiral John L. Hall while the Western Islands Group (Task Group 51.1) under Rear Admiral Ingolf N. Kiland and the 77th Infantry Division secured Kerama Retto and other offshore islands before landing at Ie Shima. Task Group 51.2 would subsequently serve as a floating reserve for the U.S. Tenth Army (Task Force 56), commanded by Lieutenant General Simon B. Buckner, USA, before returning to Saipan.

Wright was ordered to Pearl Harbor to begin planning the invasion of the Japanese home islands, which would begin with Operation Olympic, the invasion of the southern island of Kyūshū. Wright's Amphibious Group Five would be part of the 5th Amphibious Force, commanded by Vice Admiral Harry W. Hill, which would land the V Amphibious Corps (VAC) on the west coast in the Kaminokawa – Kushikino area. Amphibious Group Five would consist of four old battleships, ten cruisers, fourteen destroyers, and seventy-four support craft. However, Operation Olympic and the follow-up invasion of Honshū (Operation Coronet) were cancelled following the dropping of the atomic bombs on Hiroshima and Nagasaki. Rear Admiral Jerauld Wright was awarded a Bronze Star, with a combat "V" device, for his leadership as the commander of Task Group 51.2 during Operation Iceberg.

===== Cruiser Division Six =====
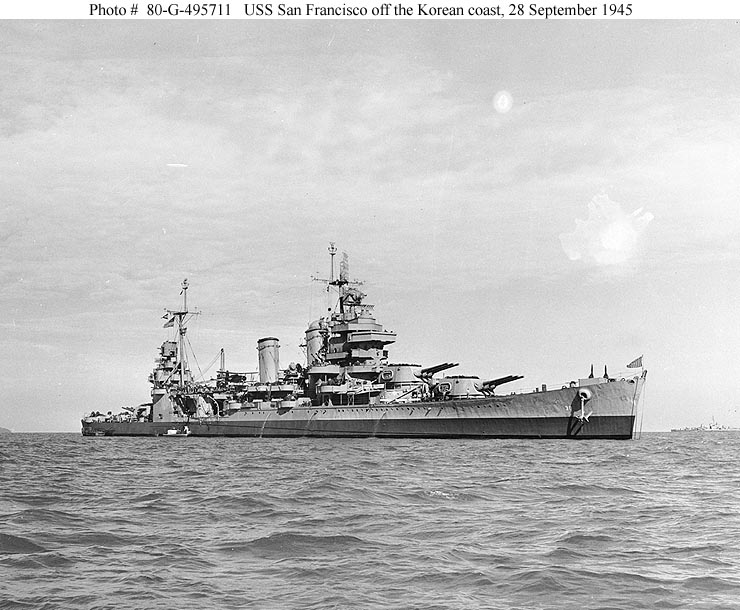
USS San Francisco (1945)

Rear Admiral Jerauld Wright took command of Cruiser Division Six (CruDiv 6), with USS San Francisco, a New Orleans-class cruiser, serving as his flagship. In early October 1945, CruDiv 6 was assigned to assist the post-surrender activities and general-purpose peace-keeping duties throughout the Yellow Sea and Gulf of Bohai region as a unit of the U.S. Seventh Fleet under the command of Vice Admiral Thomas C. Kinkaid. Wright's force showed the flag, making port visits at Tianjin, Qingdao, Port Arthur, and Qinhuangdao. At the final port call at Jinsen, Wright acted as the senior-ranking member of the committee that accepted the surrender of Japanese naval forces throughout Korea.

=== Cold War ===
==== Operational Readiness Division ====
In October 1945, Wright joined the Office of the Chief of Naval Operations (OPNAV) as the head of its Operational Readiness Division, helping to organize this newly created organization. Other OPNAV divisions created were Plans (OP-31), Combat Intelligence (OP-32), Operations (OP-33), and Anti-submarine Warfare (OP-35) within the Chief of Naval Operations. Wright organized OP-34 into four sections, and working with his sister divisions, Wright directed the development of a host of manuals on tactical doctrine based upon experience from World War II. Wright involved civilian think tanks, such as the Operation Evaluation Group (OEG), in projects undertaken by OP-34. CNO Fleet Admiral Chester W. Nimitz appointed Wright to chair the U.S. Navy's Air Defense Committee to help improve fleet air defenses. Wright also succeeded Rear Admiral Walter DeLaney as the chairman of the Joint Army-Navy Assessment Committee (JANAC), an inter-service agency set up in 1943 to analyze and assess Japanese naval and merchant marine shipping losses caused by U.S. and Allied forces during World War II.

==== Commander Amphibious Forces U.S. Atlantic Fleet ====
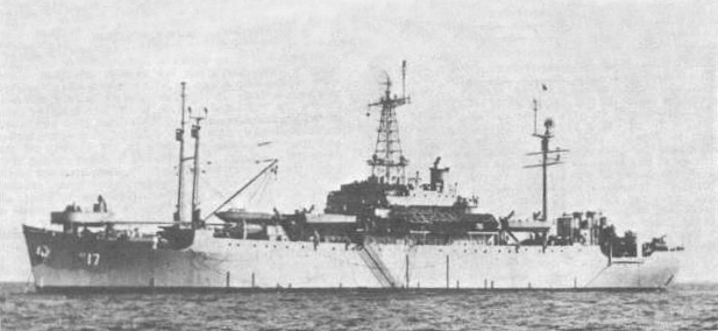
USS Taconic (AGC-17)

On November 24, 1948, Wright assumed command of Amphibious Forces U.S. Atlantic Fleet (COMPHIBLANT), a position that he held through November 1, 1950. Based at the Norfolk Naval Station, Wright would be responsible for three major subordinate commands, Amphibious Group Two, Amphibious Group Four and the Little Creek Naval Amphibious Base. COMPHIBLANT also included Amphibious Training, an Amphibious Air Control Group, a Naval Beach Group, a Detached Group, and a Mediterranean Group. Wright's flagship was USS Taconic, an Adirondack-class amphibious force command ship. The most significant accomplishment during Wright's tour of duty as COMPHIBLANT was PORTREX, a multi-service amphibious assault exercise held from February 25 to March 11, 1950. PORTREX was the largest peacetime amphibious exercise up to that time and it was staged to evaluate joint doctrine for combined operations, test new equipment under simulated combat conditions and provide training for the defense of the Caribbean.

Over 65,000 men and 160 ships were involved, and it was climaxed by a combined amphibious and airborne assault on Vieques Island, a first in military history. The success of PORTREX offered a prelude for future amphibious operations, including the landings at Incheon during the Korean War. Jerauld Wright received his third star, effective September 14, 1950, at the conclusion of his tour of duty as COMPHIBLANT.

==== Standing Group – North Atlantic Treaty Organization ====
Wright served as the deputy U.S. representative to Standing Group (SG) of the newly formed North Atlantic Treaty Organization (NATO), serving from November 1950 to February 1952. The Standing Group was the standing planning organization under NATO's Military Committee, composed of military representatives from the United States, Great Britain, and France. At the time of Wright's tour of duty, SG membership was General of the Army Omar Bradley, United States Army, Marshal of the Royal Air Force Lord Tedder, Royal Air Force and Lieutenant General Paul Ely, French Army. The Standing Group was charged with providing policy guidance and military-related information to NATO's various regional planning groups, including General Dwight D. Eisenhower at SHAPE headquarters. The Standing Group undertook short-term (STDP), mid-term (MTDP), and long-range (LTDP) strategic military planning for the NATO alliance, as well as making recommendations regarding NATO's unified military command structure, which included the creation of a Supreme Allied Commander Atlantic (SACLANT) billet.

==== Commander-in-Chief, U.S. Naval Forces Eastern Atlantic and Mediterranean ====
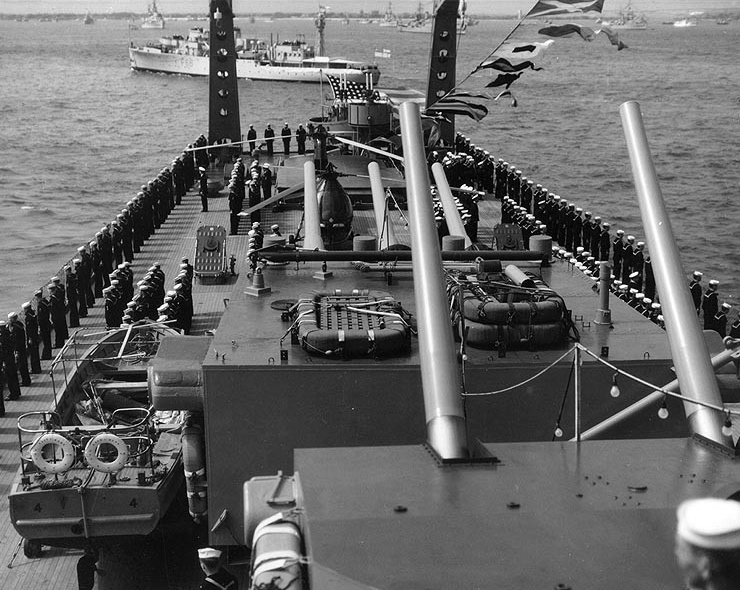
USS Baltimore at Coronation Naval Review – Spithead (1953)

Wright became the Commander-in-Chief, U.S. Naval Forces Eastern Atlantic and Mediterranean (CINCNELM), an important U.S. Navy fleet command, effective June 14, 1952. CINCELM's area of responsibility (AOR) stretched from the eastern Atlantic through the Indian Ocean to Singapore.

Wright's operational control over the Sixth Fleet proved to be a source of friction with Admiral Lord Louis Mountbatten, RN, NATO's Commander-in-Chief Allied Forces Mediterranean (CINCAFMED). Mountbatten felt that the Sixth Fleet should be assigned to his command while Wright wanted to maintain control of the fleet, particularly its nuclear-armed aircraft carriers, pursuant to both U.S. Navy policy and Federal law. The dispute tested the diplomatic skills of both men. CINCNELM forces participated in NATO Operation Mariner and Operation Weldfast exercises during 1953, and units of the Sixth Fleet did participate in NATO exercises while staying under U.S. control.

As CINCNELM, Wright maintained strong diplomatic ties with allies within his area of responsibility. He made a 14-day goodwill trip to the Middle East that culminated with a courtesy call with the newly crowned King Saud bin Abdul Aziz in Jidda, Saudi Arabia. Later, Wright attended the coronation ceremonies of King Hussein of Jordan in May 1953. In June 1953, Wright served as the senior U.S. Navy representative at the coronation pageant of Queen Elizabeth II, including flying his flag from the heavy cruiser USS Baltimore during the Coronation Naval Review of Spithead on June 15. Admiral Wright also made the arrangements for United States Ambassador to the United Kingdom Winthrop Aldrich to present a bronze plaque of John Paul Jones from the Naval Historical Center to the British government, initiating his longtime association with the famous naval hero of the American Revolution.

During a high-level conference in Washington from October 20 to November 4, 1953, Wright was informed that CINCNELM was to become a subordinate command of the U.S. Atlantic Fleet reporting directly to Admiral Lynde D. McCormick, the Commander-in-Chief U.S. Atlantic Fleet (CINCLANTFLT). Also, Wright would become the head of NATO's Eastern Atlantic Area, reporting to Admiral McCormick, the first Supreme Allied Commander Atlantic (SACLANT). Jeruald Wright was promoted to the rank of Admiral effective April 1, 1954.

==== Atlantic Command ====
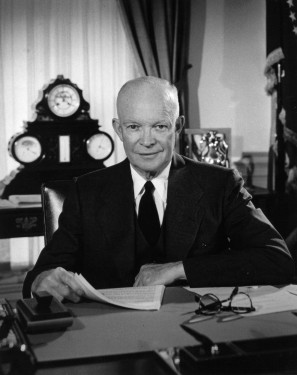
President Dwight D. Eisenhower

Admiral Wright's final command assignment proved to be the most challenging undertaking in his career as he literally took on three concurrent roles, namely Commander-in-Chief of the U.S. Atlantic Fleet (CINCLANTFLT), Commander-in-Chief of the U.S. Atlantic Command (CINCLANT) and Supreme Allied Commander Atlantic (SACLANT) of NATO's Allied Command Atlantic (ACLANT). While his nomination to become CINCLANTFLT and CINCLANT was made by the President of the United States, subject to the advice and consent of the United States Senate, Wright's appointment to become SACLANT was subject to the approval of the North Atlantic Council. Fortunately, Wright was a known commodity since he had served as the deputy U.S. representative to NATO's Standing Group from November 1950 to February 1952.

President Dwight D. Eisenhower noted in his February 1, 1954 announcement:

I feel that Admiral Wright is extremely well qualified to perform the duties of Supreme Allied Commander, Atlantic. Admiral Wright has extensive background and naval command experience in positions of vital importance and he is an officer of outstanding character and ability. Admiral Wright has served as Deputy U.S. Representative to the Standing Group of the North Atlantic Treaty Organization and is thoroughly cognizant of the duties and responsibilities of SACLANT. I feel that Admiral Wright will uphold and carry forward the fine traditions and worthy objectives sought by all the NATO nations. I have every confidence that Admiral Wright can make an outstanding contribution to our common defense effort.

Wright assumed command of the U.S. Atlantic Fleet, the U.S. Atlantic Command, and Allied Command Atlantic on April 12, 1954, relieving Admiral Lynde D. McCormick who had been the first Supreme Allied Commander Atlantic.

===== Command structure and responsibilities =====
Wright's command responsibilities included acting as Commander-in-Chief U.S. Atlantic Fleet (CINCLANTFLT), one of the two major fleet commands within the U.S. Navy with responsibility for all naval operations throughout the Atlantic Ocean; Commander-in-Chief U.S. Atlantic Command (CINCLANT), a unified command responsible for U.S. military operation throughout the Atlantic Ocean geographical region; and Supreme Allied Commander Atlantic (SACLANT), one of the two principal military commands for the North Atlantic Treaty Organization (NATO), responsible for keeping the sea lanes open between the United States and Europe.

===== Fleet modernization =====
Wright inherited a U.S. Atlantic Fleet in transition as the U.S. Navy was going through a modernization period to replace warships and aircraft built during World War II.

===== Fleet readiness =====
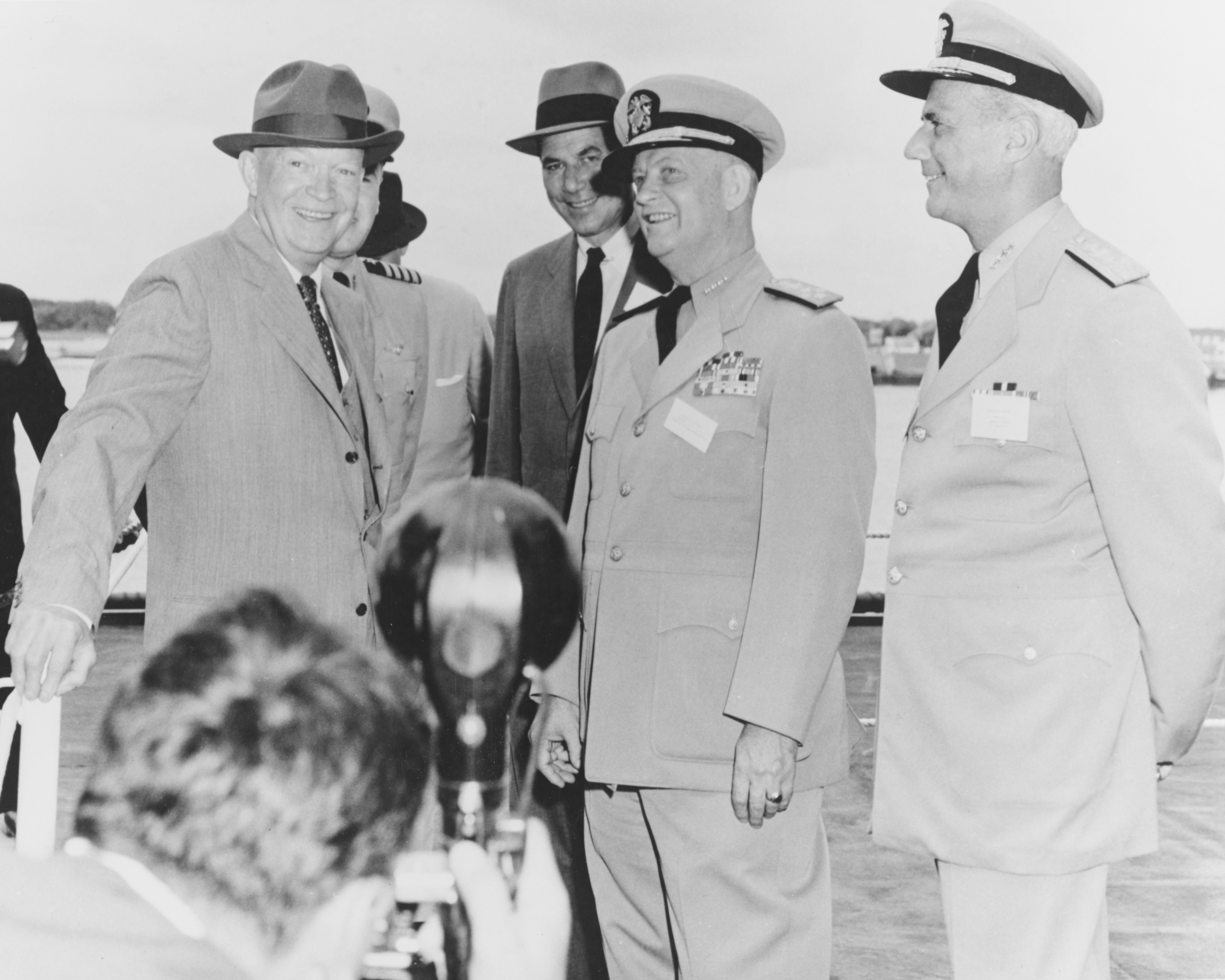
Lantflex I-57: President Eisenhower, Navy Secretary Gates, Admiral Burke, and Admiral Wright (l–r)

For Wright, the best method to evaluate fleet readiness for the U.S. Atlantic Fleet was the staging and execution of naval exercises like Lantflex I-57. Among the high-level observers for this naval exercise were the President Dwight D. Eisenhower and many other members of the US cabinet. The highlight of Lantflex I-57 was the landing of two A3D Sky Warriors and two F8U Crusaders on board USS Saratoga that had been launched from USS Bon Homme Richard operating in the Pacific, the first carrier-to-carrier transcontinental flight in history.

Other Atlantic Fleet exercises included Operation Springboard, the annual winter naval maneuvers in the Caribbean Sea. Units of the U.S. Atlantic Fleet and the Royal Canadian Navy participated in Operation Sweep Clear III, a bilateral mine warfare exercise, between July and August 1958. Also, in 1960, the U.S. Atlantic Fleet initiated UNITAS, an annual multilateral series of exercises between the South Atlantic Force (SOLANTFOR) and Latin American navies. As SACLANT, Wright coordinated such NATO naval exercises as Operation Sea Watch, a convoy escort exercise. However, the most significant naval exercise during Admiral Wright's tour of duty was Operation Strikeback, a ten-day exercise involving over 250,000 men, 300 ships, and 1,500 aircraft during September 1957, which was the largest naval exercise staged by NATO up to that time. Under Admiral Wright, the U.S. Atlantic Fleet also took the lead on the field of operational testing and evaluation (OT&E) of systems and tactics, particularly regarding anti-submarine warfare for the United States Navy, with the Operational Development Force (OPDEVFOR), under the command of Rear Admiral William D. Irvin, serving as the lead agency for this effort.

Finally, in February 1959, when several transatlantic cables off Newfoundland were cut and the Soviet fishing trawler MV Novorossisk was operating in the vicinity at the time of the break, the radar-picket ASW destroyer USS Roy O. Hale was dispatched to enforce the 1884 Convention for the Protection of Submarine Cables. On the August 26, the Hale sent a boarding party to the Novorossisk to investigate and determined that there were no indications of intentions "other than fishing." A diplomatic protest was lodged, but there were no more breaks.

===== Anti-submarine warfare =====
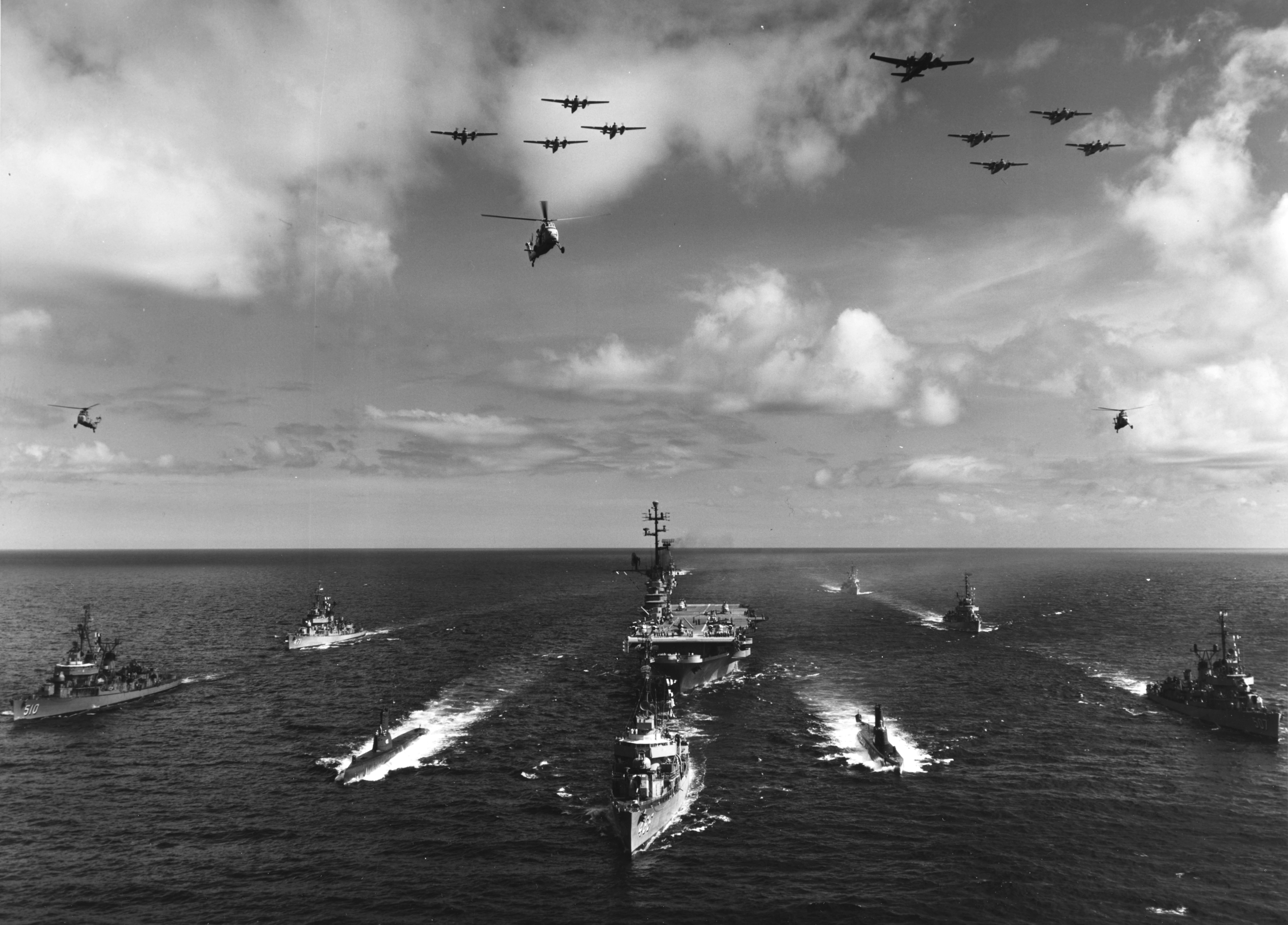
Task Force Alfa (1959)

Wright stated in a Time magazine article from 1958 that: "The primary mission of every combat ship in the Atlantic Fleet is antisubmarine. Everything else is secondary." Given his previous exposure to anti-submarine warfare (ASW) doctrine at OP-34, Wright was a natural fit for overseeing the anti-submarine renaissance during his tour of duty as CINCLANTFLT. One significant innovation was the Sound Surveillance System (SOSUS), a network of underwater hydrophones and listening posts designed to track the movement of submarines. The first operational test of SOSUS was done during the ASDevEx 1–54 exercise from April 6 to June 7, 1954.

However, 1958 news accounts about the growing threat of the Soviet snorkel-equipped diesel-electric submarine force began to gain the attention of the American public. Central Intelligence Agency Director Allen Dulles was reported to have said that ten missile-carrying Soviet submarines could destroy 1600 square miles (4144 km^{2}) of the industrial-rich eastern seaboard in a sneak attack. Also, an Associated Press dispatch, dated April 14, 1958, quoted U.S. Congressman Carl Durham D-North Carolina, who said that 184 Soviet submarines had been sighted off the U.S. Atlantic coast during 1957.

Chief of Naval Operations (CNO) Arleigh A. Burke had responded on April 1 by creating Task Force Alfa, a hunter-killer (HUK) flotilla under the command of Rear Admiral John S. Thach, which would develop new ASW tactics to counter this growing Soviet submarine threat.

Wright's personal contribution provided the first look at a missile-armed Soviet submarine, a Project AV611/Zulu-V variant armed with two R-11FM ("SS-1b Scud-A") ballistic missiles. Wright also spearheaded the establishment of the SACLANT ASW Research Centre, created on May 2, 1959, in La Spezia, Italy, to serve as a clearinghouse for NATO's anti-submarine efforts. The efforts of the Atlantic Fleet to develop and implement new ASW tactics during Admiral Wright's tour of duty laid the groundwork for the success that the U.S. Navy had in locating and tracking Soviet submarines during the Cuban Missile Crisis.

===== Showing the flag =====
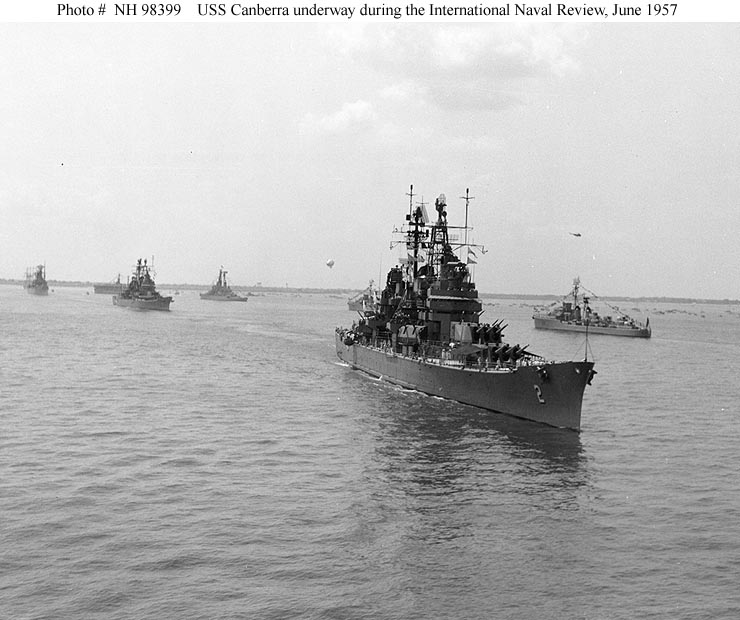
International Naval Review (1957)

One example of soft power regarding sea power is showing the flag. In his capacity as CINCLANT/CINCLANTFLT/SACLANT, Admiral Wright and his staff participated in 18 formal presentations and 62 NATO and joint military planning meetings during his six-year tour of duty in these positions.

=== Final change of command and retirement ===
The White House announced on December 31, 1959, that Admiral Jerauld Wright was stepping down as CINCLANTFLT/CINCLANT/SACLANT, with President Dwight D. Eisenhower reflecting wider sentiment when he noted:

I would like to take this opportunity to express my personal thanks and that of the American people for the services which you have performed over a period of the last six years. The North Atlantic Treaty Organization represents an endeavor on the part of fifteen free nations, the success of which is vital to the security and well-being of the United States. Thus, the position of Commander of one of the major commands of this organization is one of the greatest responsibility. The leadership and judgment which you have displayed in this capacity have been a source of deep satisfaction to me personally, and I know has won the great admiration not only of the nations of the North Atlantic Treaty Organization but of all the Free World.

On February 29, 1960, Wright stepped down as CINCLANTFLT/CINCLANT/SACLANT, retiring after 46 years of service in the United States Navy effective March 1, 1960. Admiral Wright received a second Distinguished Service Medal in recognition of his six-year as CINCLANTFLT/CINCLANT/SACLANT from Secretary of the Navy William B. Franke in a special ceremony held on board the supercarrier USS Independence.

=== Dates of rank ===
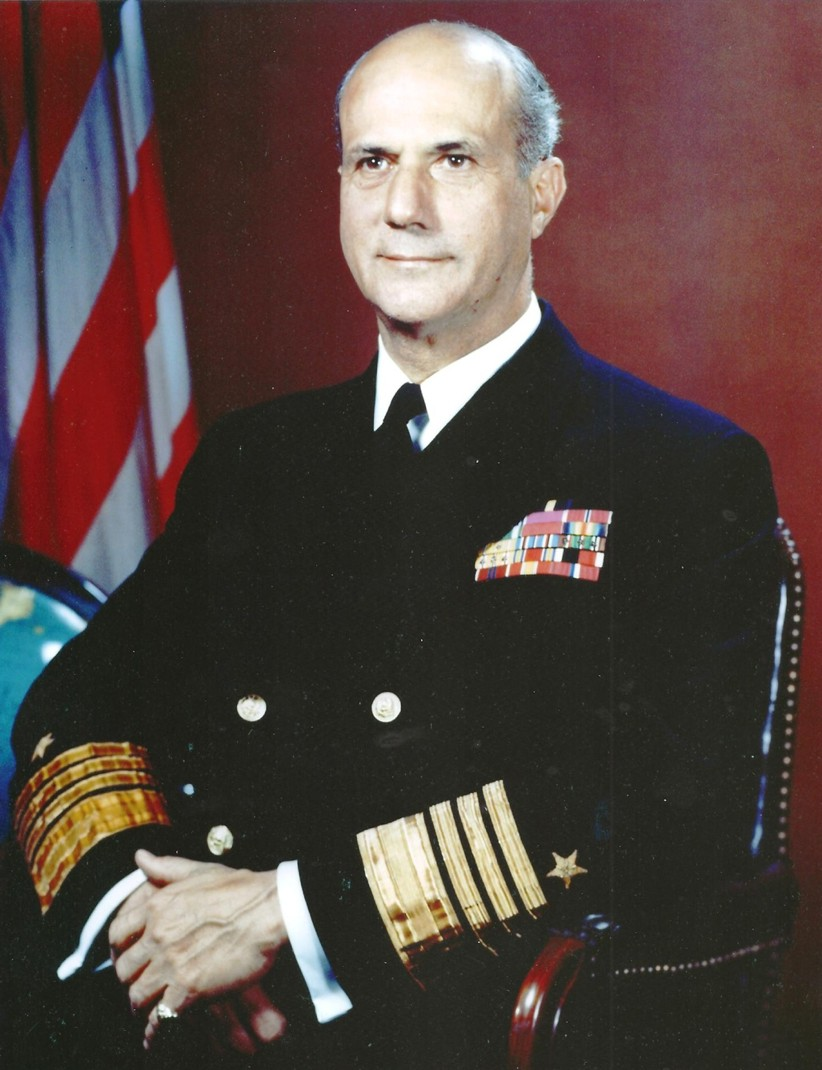
Admiral Jerauld Wright

Ensign	Lieutenant junior grade	Lieutenant	Lieutenant commander	Commander	Captain	Commodore (3)	Rear admiral	Vice admiral	Admiral
June 29, 1917	February 4, 1918	July 10, 1920 (1)	January 23, 1931	June 2, 1938	June 30, 1942 (2)	October 24, 1944	August 7, 1947 (4)	September 14, 1950	April 1, 1954

Notes

1. Wright was temporarily promoted to lieutenant on November 16, 1918.
2. Wright was temporarily promoted to captain on January 2, 1942.
3. Temporary wartime flag rank equivalent to present-day U.S. Navy rank of rear admiral (lower half).
4. Wright temporarily promoted to rear admiral on November 27, 1944, which was made retroactive effective May 5, 1943.

All DOR referenced from Official U.S. Navy Biography.

=== Awards and decorations ===
==== Distinguished Service Medal ====
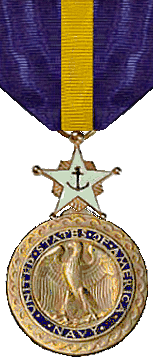

Citation excerpt (1942)

For exceptionally meritorious service ... immediately before the occupation of French North Africa by the United States Army Forces. As a member of the advanced party which effected a successful night landing along the northern coast of the continent and kept a secret rendezvous prior to the outbreak of hostilities, Captain Wright participated in vital conferences preliminary to the invasion of Morocco and Algeria. In addition to assisting the conception and organization of plans for offensive operations, he personally commanded the vessel in which General Henri Giraud made his escape from France. ...

Gold Star in lieu of the Second Distinguished Service Medal (1960)

For exceptionally meritorious service to the Government of the United States in a duty of great responsibility while serving as Supreme Allied Commander Atlantic, Commander in Chief Atlantic, and Commander in Chief United States Atlantic Fleet, from March 1954 to March 1960. Exercising the highest type of leadership and diplomacy in administering the great responsibilities of his multinational commands and in accomplishing the objectives of his complex missions, Admiral Wright has contributed significantly to our national posture and has aided materially in advancing the objectives of the United States toward stabilizing world peace. In dealing with the highest level military and civilian representatives of foreign governments, he has been greatly instrumental in enhancing unanimity of effort in the discharge of the responsibilities of the United States in the North Atlantic Treaty Organization, achieving the trust and confidence of the leaders of the NATO countries and contributing substantially to the further strengthening and effectiveness of that Organization. Admiral Wright's exceptional professional ability and inspiring devotion to the fulfillment of an exceptionally important and exacting assignment, reflects the highest credit upon himself (and) represents the crowning achievements of a distinguished career ...

==== Silver Star ====
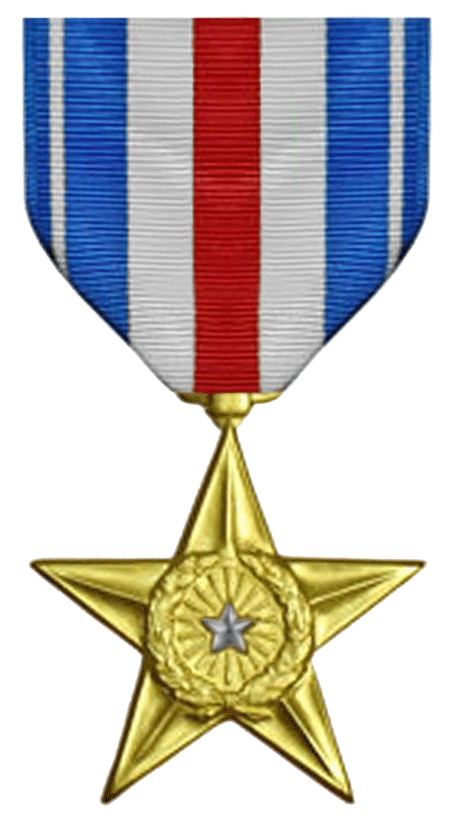

Citation Excerpt (1944)

:For conspicuous gallantry and intrepidity as Commanding Officer of the USS SANTA FE, in action against enemy Japanese forces, October 13, to 17, 1944. Skilled and courageous in directing his command in its assigned missions to protect the withdrawal of two severely damaged ships from enemy infested waters, Rear Admiral Wright contributed essentially to the expeditious accomplishment of his hazardous salvage operation, providing efficient and effective support against hostile air attacks and making possible the successful reclamation of the damaged ships ...

==== Legion of Merit ====
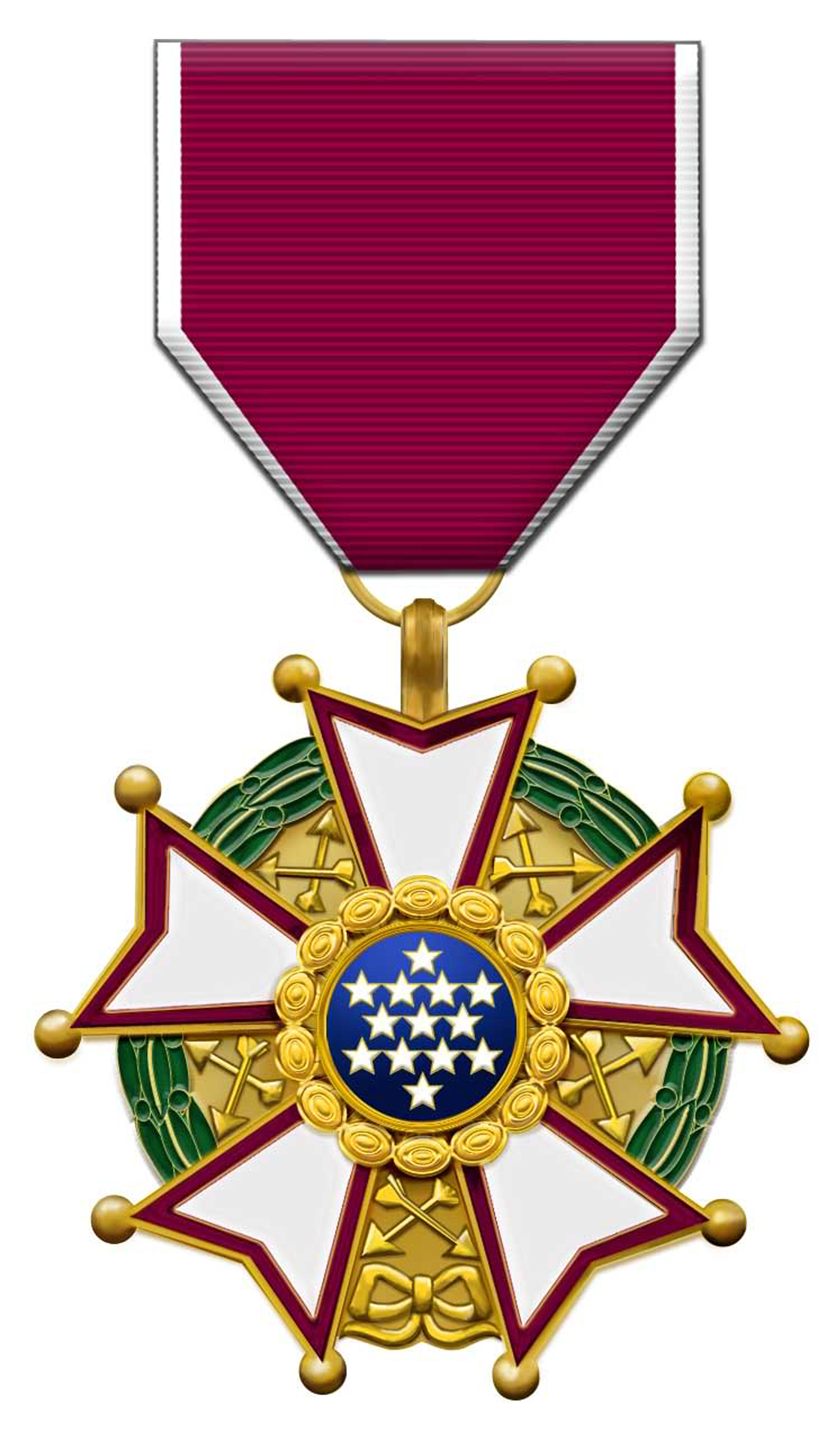

Citation excerpt

For meritorious service of a high degree in connection with a mission by submarine to Algeria, and negotiations with the French near that city prior to the occupation of North Africa by Allied Forces. In this duty he displayed good judgment, tact, and soldiery qualities that reflect great credit to the United States Navy.

Gold Star in lieu of a second Legion of Merit

For exceptionally meritorious conduct ... as Assistant Chief of Staff of the Commander United States Naval Forces, Northwest African Waters, prior to and during the landing of forces in Sicily and Italy. Working tirelessly, (he) assisted in the drawing up of plans for the landing of United States forces in Sicily and ... Allied forces in Italy ... (and) helped to coordinate the various functions of the staff ...

==== Bronze Star with combat "V" device ====
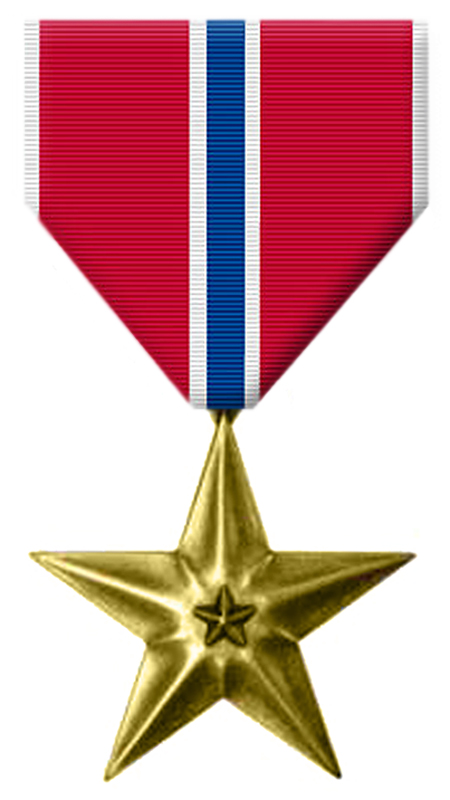

Citation Excerpt

For meritorious service in connection with operations against the enemy as Commander of an Amphibious Group from December 1944 to August 1945, during the planning, staging and execution of an amphibious assault upon and conquest of Okinawa Shima, Nanse Shoto ... Subsequent to this operation, he participated in the preparation of plans for further amphibious combat operations. His conduct throughout distinguished him among those performing duties of the same character. ...

==== Letter of Commendation ====
For distinguished service ... during the operation against the Japanese bases at Tinian, Saipan and Guam in the Marianas, on February 22, 1944. In this action for the first time in the war in the Pacific, a Carrier Task Fore was discovered by the enemy and obliged to fight its way to its objective. Throughout these operations he at all times fought his ship with courage and skill. During the night 21 – February 22 the screen of which his ship was a part shot down at least eight enemy planes in flames and drove off all others before they could inflict damage upon the Task Force. ...

==== Other awards and decorations ====
In addition, over the course of his career Wright received World War I Victory Medal (Patrol Clasp), American Defense Service Medal (Fleet Clasp), European-African-Middle Eastern Campaign Medal, Asiatic-Pacific Campaign Medal, World War II Victory Medal, National Defense Service Medal, the Legion of Honor (with rank of Chevalier) from the Government of France, and the Knight Grand Cross of the Order of Orange-Nassau from the Government of the Netherlands.

== Recall to duty ==
=== CIA Board of National Estimates ===
Wright was recalled to active duty on January 12, 1961, to serve as the U.S. Navy representative on the Central Intelligence Agency (CIA) Board of National Estimates (BNE), and after completing his BNE assignment, and was released from active duty effective May 13, 1963. The Office of National Estimates (ON/E) had been created in 1950 and was responsible for issuing National Intelligence Estimate (NIE), which "should deal with matters of wide scope relevant to the determination of basic policy, such as the assessment of a country's war potential, its preparedness for war, its strategy capabilities and intentions, its vulnerability to various forms of direct attack or indirect pressures." The ON/E Board included prominent American citizens with distinguished intelligence, academic, military, and diplomatic credentials, who would oversee NIE documents.

=== United States Ambassador to the Republic of China (Taiwan) ===
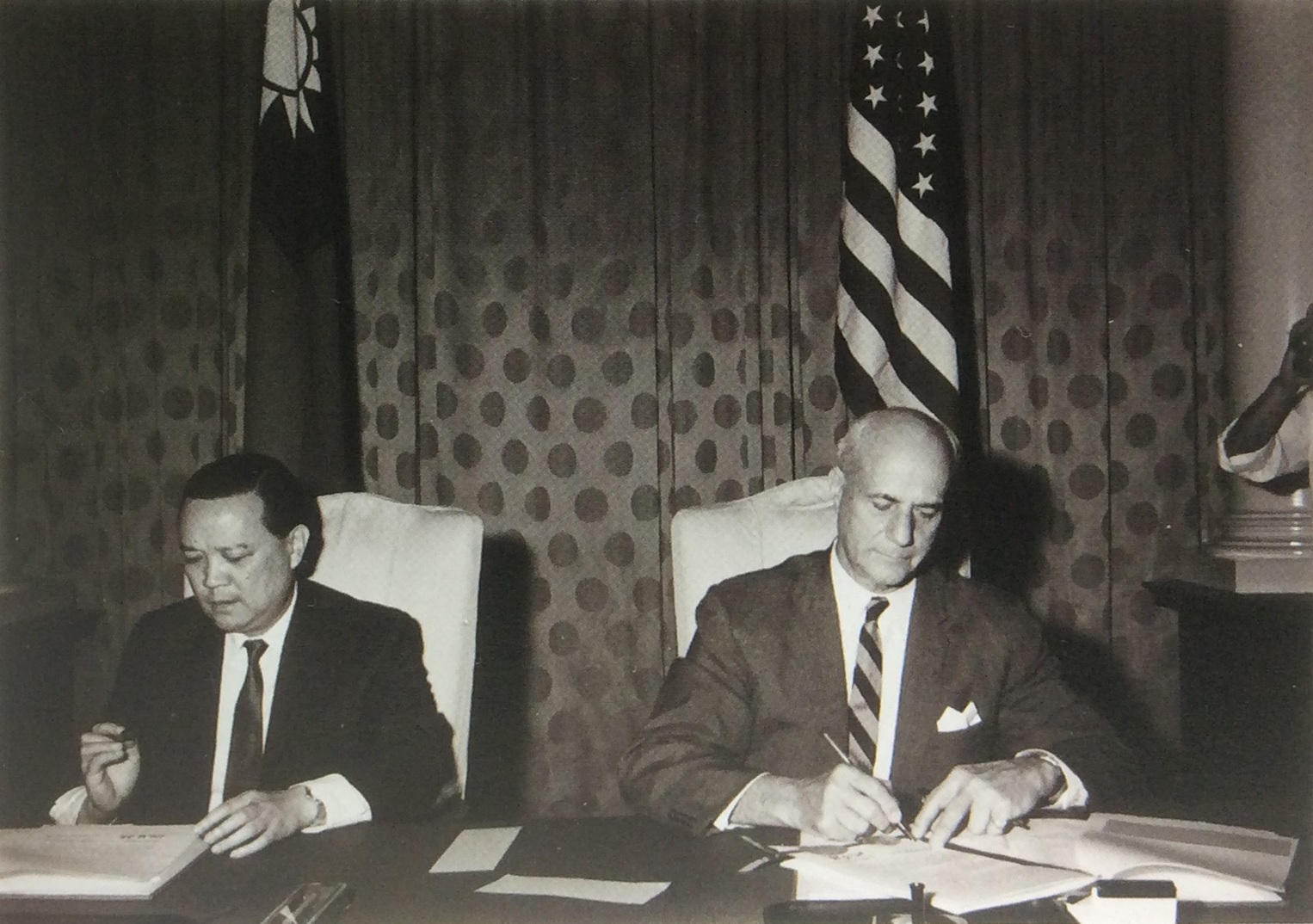
Jerauld Wright (right), Ambassador to the Republic of China(Taiwan), signed an agreement to further educational and cultural exchanges with Foreign Minister Shen Chang-huan (left) on 23 April 1964.

Wright was contacted by Under Secretary of State for Political Affairs W. Averell Harriman regarding the ambassadorship to the Republic of China (Taiwan). The current U.S. ambassador, retired Admiral Alan G. Kirk, was in declining health and had recommended Wright as his replacement. After discussing it with his family, Wright accepted. Ambassador Wright presented his credentials to President Chiang Kai-shek on June 29, 1963. Ambassador Wright won praise for his sensitive handling of the aftermath to the assassination of John F. Kennedy from both the embassy staff and government officials of the Republic of China. Wright also closely monitored the tense military situation between Taiwan and mainland China, particularly the potential flashpoint of Qemoy. Wright also successfully concluded a Status of Forces Agreement with the Republic of China. On July 25, 1965, Jerauld Wright stepped down as the U.S. Ambassador of the Republic of China, closing the final chapter on his public life.

== Personal ==
=== Family ===
The future wife of Wright was born Phyllis B. Thompson on April 2, 1906, in New York City. She graduated from Miss Porter's School and made her debut in 1924 with Janet Lee, the future mother of Jacqueline Kennedy Onassis. She worked for the Women's Organization for National Prohibition Reform (WONPR) in New York. In 1933, Phyllis Thompson joined the Federal Alcohol Control Administration (FACA) in Washington, D.C. and subsequently worked, briefly, at the Federal Housing Administration (FHA). In 1935, she became the society editor for the Washington Evening Star. Phyllis Thompson meet Jerry Wright through his sister, Marjorie Wright Key, who had also attended Miss Porter's School. Their marriage took place at St. Andrew's Dune Church, in, on July 23, 1938, which Phyllis wrote as her last wedding notice for the Washington Evening Star as their society editor. Jerry and Phyllis Wright had two children – Marion Jerauld Wright (1941– ) and William Mason Wright (1945– ).

Phyllis Wright wrote about her experiences as a navy wife and the wife of an ambassador in a Navy Wife's Log (1978) and a Taiwan Scrapbook (1992) She was a former president of the Sulgrave Club and a member of the Metropolitan and Chevy Chase clubs. Phyllis Thompson Wright died on October 20, 2002, at the National Naval Medical Center in Bethesda, Maryland, from cancer. She was survived by her two children, Marion Wright of Denver and William Wright of Arlington. She was interred with her late husband at the Arlington National Cemetery.

=== Artwork ===
In retirement, Wright pursued an interest in painting, whose whimsical style was similar to Grandma Moses. His artwork was displayed in exhibits at the Brook Club, the Knickerbocker Club, and the Sulgrave Club.

=== Memberships ===
Wright was a long-time member of the United States Naval Institute, serving as its president from 1959 to 1960 and was a frequent contributor to its Proceedings, including an insightful December 1951 article on the challenges facing the newly created NATO. Wright's other memberships included the Alibi Club, the Chevy Chase Club, the Metropolitan Club, the Knickerbocker Club, the Brook Club, Alfalfa Club, and the United States Navy League.

=== Death ===
Wright died on April 27, 1995, of pneumonia in Washington, D.C., at the age of 96. He was survived by his wife of 56 years, Phyllis; a son, William Mason Wright of Arlington; and a daughter, Marion Jerauld Wright of Denver. He was buried with full military honors in Section 2 of the Arlington National Cemetery next to his father and mother, and would be joined by his wife Phyllis upon her death in 2002.

== Legacy ==
=== Honorary degrees ===
Wright received honorary degrees from the Rose Polytechnic Institute, the University of Massachusetts Amherst, and the College of William and Mary.

=== Wright Island ===
Wright Island (74°2′S 116°50′W) is an ice-covered island 35 miles (60 km) long, lying at the north edge of Getz Ice Shelf about midway between Carney Island and Martin Peninsula, on the Bakutis Coast, Marie Byrd Land. Delineated from air photos taken by U.S. Navy Operation Highjump in January 1947, it was named by the Advisory Committee on Antarctic Names (US-ACAN) after Admiral Jerauld Wright who was in over-all command of Operation Deep Freeze during the International Geophysical Year 1957–58.

=== Jerauld Wright Award ===
Jerauld Wright Award

In light of the growing threat of Soviet submarine activity within his command area, as well as in retaliation for the recent aggressive depth-charging of USS Gudgeon near Vladivostok, Wright issued the following challenge:

Whereas, the presence of unidentified submarines in the approaches to the United has been frequently reported, and

Whereas, the submarines have been uncooperative in declaring either their identity and their intent as is required by the customs and usages of honorable seamen, and

Whereas, tangible evidence that these surreptitious are being conducted would result in appropriate embarrassment to those involved.

Therefore I do hereby pledge to donate one case of Jack Daniels Old No. 7 Brand of Quality Tennessee Sour Mash Corn Whiskey, made as our fathers made it for seven generations at the oldest distillery in the United States, established in 1866, to the first Scene of Action commander who evidence that a "non U.S. or known friendly" submarine has been worn out.

/s/

Jerauld Wright

Admiral, U.S. Navy

On May 29, 1959, USS Grenadier, a Tench-class submarine working in conjunction with Patrol Squadron 5 (VP-5), chased a Soviet submarine near Iceland for nine hours before forcing it to surface, and its commanding officer, Lt. Commander Theodore F. Davis, received the case of whiskey from Admiral Wright and the distinction of being the first to surface a Soviet submarine by the U.S. Navy.

Admiral Wright Award would be presented, with an accompanying case of whiskey, on two other occasions:

- On October 29, 1962, USS Charles P. Cecil, a Gearing-class destroyer, had chased a Soviet submarine throughout the Caribbean for nearly two days during the Cuban Missile Crisis.
- The third instance occurred off Gibraltar in 1967, Where the USS Sam Houston SSBN-609 photographed a Russian submarine entering the straights of Gibraltar submerged.

=== John Paul Jones Cottage Museum ===
Retired admirals Jerauld Wright and Sir Nigel Henderson, RN, spearheaded the effort to restore the Scottish birthplace of John Paul Jones back to its original 1747 condition. The cottage that houses a museum dedicated to the life and accomplishments of John Paul Jones was opened in 1993, and it is situated on the original location on the estate of Arbigland in the Stewartry of Kirkcudbright.

== See also ==
- Atomic Energy Act of 1946
- Cold War (1947–1953)
- Cold War (1953–1962)

== Notes ==
Military offices
Preceded by Ralph O. Davis	Commander, Amphibious Forces, United States Atlantic Fleet; November 24, 1948 – November 1, 1950	Succeeded by Robert P. Briscoe
Preceded by Robert B. Carney	Commander in Chief, United States Naval Forces Europe; June 14, 1952 – March 19, 1954	Succeeded by John H. Cassady
Preceded by Lynde D. McCormick	Commander in Chief, United States Atlantic Fleet; April 12, 1954 – February 29, 1960	Succeeded by Robert L. Dennison
Preceded by Lynde D. McCormick	Commander in Chief, United States Atlantic Command; April 12, 1954 – February 29, 1960	Succeeded by Robert L. Dennison
Preceded by Lynde D. McCormick	Supreme Allied Commander Atlantic; April 12, 1954 – February 29, 1960	Succeeded by Robert L. Dennison
Diplomatic posts
Preceded by Alan G. Kirk	United States Ambassador to China; May 3, 1963 – July 25, 1965	Succeeded by Walter P. McConaughy
