= Operation Flagpole =

Operation Flagpole may refer to:

- Operation Flagpole (World War II) – a secret mission in 1942 to secure the cooperation of Vichy France officers to the Allied invasion of North Africa
- Operation Flagpole (1963) – a joint United States Seventh Fleet–Republic of Korea naval exercise held in June 1963
