= Operation Flagpole (World War II) =

1942 military operation in North Africa

- Part of Operation Torch
- Operational scope: diplomatic, operational
- Location: Gibraltar, Algeria
- Planned: October 16, 1942
- Planned by: AFHQ
- Objective: secure cooperation of Vichy France officers in French North Africa
- Outcome: successful

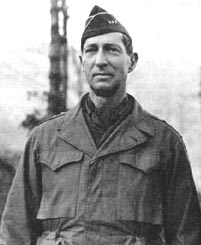
Major General Mark Clark

Operation Flagpole was part of the run-up to Operation Torch, the planned Allied invasion of North Africa during World War II. It involved arranging for and carrying out a top-secret high-level meeting between U.S. General Mark W. Clark, representing the Allies, and Général Charles E. Mast, the leader of a group of pro-Allied Vichy France officers in French North Africa, to secure their cooperation with the invasion.

== Planning ==
On October 16, 1942, a meeting was held in Operation Torch's staff headquarters at Norfolk House in London. Among those present were:

- Lieutenant General Dwight D. Eisenhower, United States Army, the Allied commander for Operation Torch
- Major General Mark W. Clark, United States Army, the recently appointed deputy commander for Torch
- Brigadier General Lyman L. Lemnitzer, U.S. Army, head of the allied force planning section for Torch
- Colonel Archelaus L. Hamblen, U.S. Army, the staff expert on shipping and supply
- Colonel Julius C. Holmes, U.S. Army, head of civil affairs branch for Torch
- Rear Admiral Bernard H. Bieri, United States Navy, senior U.S. naval representative
- Captain Jerauld Wright, U.S. Navy, liaison officer with the Royal Navy

Eisenhower informed the group that the War Department had forwarded an urgent cable from U.S. diplomat Robert D. Murphy of the American consulate in Algeria requesting the immediate dispatch of a top-secret high-level group to meet with Général Charles E. Mast, the military commander of Algiers and the leader of a group of pro-Allied officials in French North Africa.

The objective of this secret mission, code-named "Operation Flagpole", was to reach an agreement through Mast and his colleagues to have Général Henri Giraud, a key pro-Allied French army officer, step forward and take command of French military forces in North Africa, and then arrange a ceasefire with the Allied invasion force. Other alternatives, such as Jean Darlan and Charles de Gaulle, had been rejected by the British and American governments for a variety of political reasons.

Clark would be Eisenhower's personal representative, with Lemnitzer as the top invasion planner, Hamblen as the invasion's logistics expert, and Holmes serving as translator. Wright would serve as the liaison with the French Navy, with the specific objective of convincing the French to have their fleet anchored in Toulon join the Allied cause.

== Execution ==
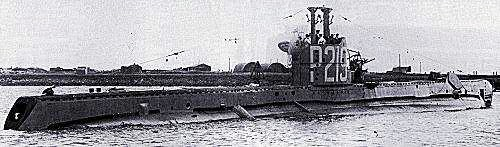
HMS Seraph

The group flew in two Boeing B-17 Flying Fortress bombers to Gibraltar, operational headquarters for the invasion, and on October 19, they boarded the British S-class submarine HMS Seraph, Lieutenant Norman Limbury Auchinleck "Bill" Jewell, RN, commanding. Seraph carried collapsible canoes, submachine guns, walkie-talkies, and other supplies, as well as three members of the British Special Boat Section – Captain G.B. ('Gruff') Courtney; and Lieutenants R.P. Livingstone and J.P. Foot.

Seraph transported Clark's party to the small fishing village of Cherchell, about 55 miles (89 km) west of Algiers. After midnight on the evening of October 21, the sub surfaced and set Clark's mission ashore, where they met with Mast and Murphy. Wright met with Capitaine de vaisseau Jean Barjot and learned that the French Navy was opposed to U.S. entry into North Africa, although the army and air force supported it. As a result of the meetings, Clark secured the agreement of the French.

On October 24, Clark's mission returned to Seraph after some inadvertent delays, and later met a seaplane that flew them back to Gibraltar, arriving back in London on October 25.

== Aftermath ==
Operation Flagpole was followed by Operation Kingpin, in which Général Giraud, code-named "Kingpin", was released from French "Zone libre" confinement and brought to Gibraltar.

== See also ==
- US Naval Bases North Africa
- North African campaign timeline
- Operation Husky
- Atlantic Theater aircraft carrier operations during World War II#Allied Invasion of North Africa (1942)
- Germain Jousse
