= HMS Seraph (P219) =

Submarine of the Royal Navy

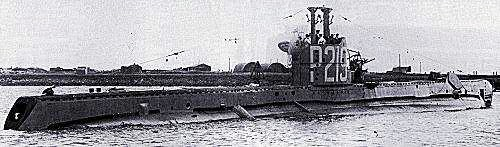
- HMS Seraph

History

United Kingdom
- Name: Seraph
- Namesake: Seraph
- Ordered: 23 June 1940
- Builder: Vickers Armstrong, Barrow-in-Furness
- Laid down: 16 August 1940
- Launched: 25 October 1941
- Commissioned: 27 June 1942
- Decommissioned: 25 October 1962
- Identification: Pennant number: P219
- Fate: Scrapped
- Badge

General characteristics
- Class & type: S-class submarine
- Displacement: 865 long tons (879 t) (surfaced); 990 long tons (1,010 t) (submerged)
- Length: 217 ft (66.1 m)
- Beam: 23 ft 9 in (7.2 m)
- Draught: 14 ft 8 in (4.5 m)
- Installed power: 1,900 bhp (1,400 kW) (diesel); 1,300 hp (970 kW) (electric)
- Propulsion: 2 × diesel engines; 2 × electric motors
- Speed: 15 kn (28 km/h; 17 mph) (surfaced); 10 kn (19 km/h; 12 mph) (submerged)
- Range: 6,000 nmi (11,000 km; 6,900 mi) at 10 knots (19 km/h; 12 mph) (surfaced); 120 nmi (220 km; 140 mi) at 3 knots (5.6 km/h; 3.5 mph) (submerged)
- Test depth: 300 ft (91.4 m)
- Complement: 48
- Sensors & processing systems: Type 129AR or 138 ASDIC; Type 291 early-warning radar
- Armament: 7 × 21 in (533 mm) torpedo tubes (6 × bow, 1 × stern); 1 × 3 in (76 mm) deck gun; 1 × 20 mm (0.8 in) AA gun

HMS Seraph (Pennant number: P219) was an S-class submarine built for the Royal Navy during the Second World War. Completed in 1942, she carried out multiple intelligence and special operations activities during World War II, the most notable of which was Operation Mincemeat.

She was afterwards assigned to the 8th Submarine Flotilla in the Mediterranean on 25 August; she found herself selected to carry out special operations duties.

== Design and description ==
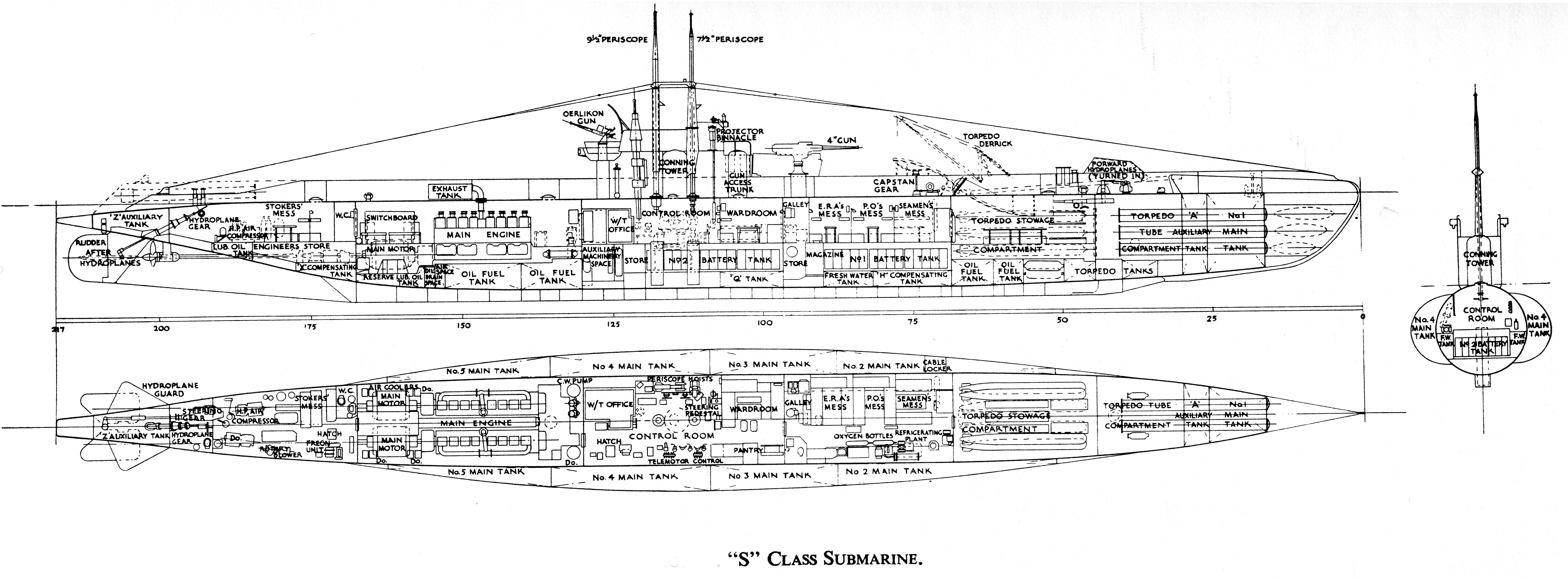
Schematic drawing of a S-class submarine

The S-class submarines were designed to patrol the restricted waters of the North Sea and the Mediterranean Sea. The third batch was slightly enlarged and improved over the preceding second batch of the S-class. The submarines had a length of 217 feet (66.1 m) overall, a beam of 23 feet 9 inches (7.2 m) and a draught of 14 feet 8 inches (4.5 m). They displaced 865 long tons (879 t) on the surface and 990 long tons (1,010 t) submerged. The S-class submarines had a crew of 48 officers and ratings. They had a diving depth of 300 feet (91.4 m).

For surface running, the boats were powered by two 950-brake-horsepower (708 kW) diesel engines, each driving one propeller shaft. When submerged each propeller was driven by a 650-horsepower (485 kW) electric motor. They could reach 15 knots (28 km/h; 17 mph) on the surface and 10 knots (19 km/h; 12 mph) underwater. On the surface, the third batch boats had a range of 6,000 nautical miles (11,000 km; 6,900 mi) at 10 knots (19 km/h; 12 mph) and 120 nmi (220 km; 140 mi) at 3 knots (5.6 km/h; 3.5 mph) submerged.

The boats were armed with seven 21-inch (533 mm) torpedo tubes. A half-dozen of these were in the bow and there was one external tube in the stern. They carried six reload torpedoes for the bow tubes for a grand total of thirteen torpedoes. Twelve mines could be carried in lieu of the internally stowed torpedoes. They were also armed with a 3-inch (76 mm) deck gun. It is uncertain if Seraph was completed with a 20-millimetre (0.8 in) Oerlikon light AA gun or had one added later. The third-batch S-class boats were fitted with either a Type 129AR or 138 ASDIC system and a Type 291 or 291W early-warning radar.

== Operation Flagpole ==
Seraph first saw action in support of Operation Torch, the Allied landings in North Africa; her first combat mission, under the command of Lieutenant Norman "Bill" Jewell, was carrying out a periscope reconnaissance of the Algerian coast during the last two weeks of September 1942.

Upon her return to Gibraltar, Seraph was assigned to Operation Flagpole, the carrying of General Dwight Eisenhower's deputy, Lieutenant General Mark W. Clark, to North Africa for secret negotiations with Vichy French officers. Loaded with collapsible canoes, submachine guns, walkie-talkies, and other supplies, the submarine carried Clark, two other United States Army generals, United States Navy Captain Jerauld Wright, several other officers, and three members of the British Special Boat Section - Captain G.B. ('Gruff') Courtney; and Lieutenants R.P. Livingstone and J.P. Foot.

Seraph then sailed to the Algerian coast on 19 October 1942. On the night of 20 October her passengers disembarked ashore. The operation was very important as it helped to reduce French opposition to the Torch landings (although the French were not informed that the troop ships were already on their way and the landings were due in just a few days).

General Clark and his party were then picked up on 25 October by the submarine after some inadvertent delays. After an uneventful return journey, Seraph landed her party in Gibraltar on 25 October.

== Operation Kingpin: "the ship with two captains" ==
On 27 October, Lt.Cdr. Jewell was ordered to set sail again to the coast of southern France for a secret rendezvous. Seraph was ordered to patrol up and down the coast until she received a signal giving her the name of the port from which she was to pick up her passengers. On the night of 5 November she finally arrived at a location some 20 miles (32 km) east of Toulon, as arranged to secretly take aboard French General Henri Giraud, his son, and three staff officers for a meeting with Eisenhower in Gibraltar, with the intention to enlist the support of the pro-Vichy forces at Oran and Casablanca to the Allied cause.

In picking up the general's party, a bit of legerdemain was needed: because Giraud flatly refused to deal with the British, and there was no US boat within 3,000 miles (4,800 km), HMS Seraph briefly became the "USS Seraph", flying the US Navy ensign. Nominally the sub came under the command of Captain Jerauld Wright, who was earlier involved in the Flagpole operation, although Jewell took care of actual operations. In the spirit of things the British crew affected American accents that they imitated from the movies. However, it fooled nobody — including Giraud, who had been told of the deception by Wright.

After the pick-up, on 7 November Seraph transferred her charges to a PBY Catalina flying boat that was sent from Gibraltar to search for her after they lost contact with the sub due to a problem with her main radio.

On 24 November, Seraph sailed on her first war patrol in the Mediterranean. She was soon called upon to join other submarines in carrying U.S. and British Commandos for reconnaissance operations in the area. On 2 December 1942 she torpedoed and damaged the Italian merchant ship Puccini. Later that month, on 23 December she rammed and damaged a U-boat, sustaining sufficient damage herself to necessitate repairs and refit back in Britain.

== Operation Mincemeat ==
Seraph returned to Blyth, northern England, for a much needed overhaul and leave on 28 January 1943. A few weeks later, Jewell was briefed at the Admiralty on Operation Mincemeat, to be carried out during Seraph's return to the Mediterranean. This mission was part of Operation Barclay, a plan to convince the Germans that the Allies intended to land in Greece and Sardinia, and not Sicily.

She set sail again on 19 April, carrying a special passenger. This was a corpse in a metal canister, packed in dry ice, and dressed in a Royal Marines uniform. Attached to the corpse was a briefcase containing faked "secret documents" designed to mislead the Axis.

In the early hours of 30 April Seraph surfaced off the coast of Spain, near the port of Huelva. Jewell and his officers launched the body and briefcase in the water, disposing of the canister in deeper waters. Jewell then radioed the signal "MINCEMEAT completed" while the submarine continued to Gibraltar. The body was picked up by the Spanish, who decided it was a courier killed in an aircraft accident. The false documents were passed to the Germans and led them to divert forces from the defence of Sicily.

== Other missions ==
By late April 1943 Seraph was back in the Mediterranean operating east of Sardinia and on 27 April she fired a salvo of three torpedoes at a merchant ship off the Strait of Bonifacio but was not successful. Again on the last two days of that month, she made similar attacks but none of these were successful and Seraph ended up being depth-charged each time. She was not damaged during these engagements, with no lives lost.

In July, during the Allied invasion of Sicily, she acted as a guide ship for the invasion force.

For the remainder of 1943 the Seraph operated against German and Italian forces in the Mediterranean theatre and attacked several convoys, but her performance in that area was lacklustre, sinking only a few small ships.

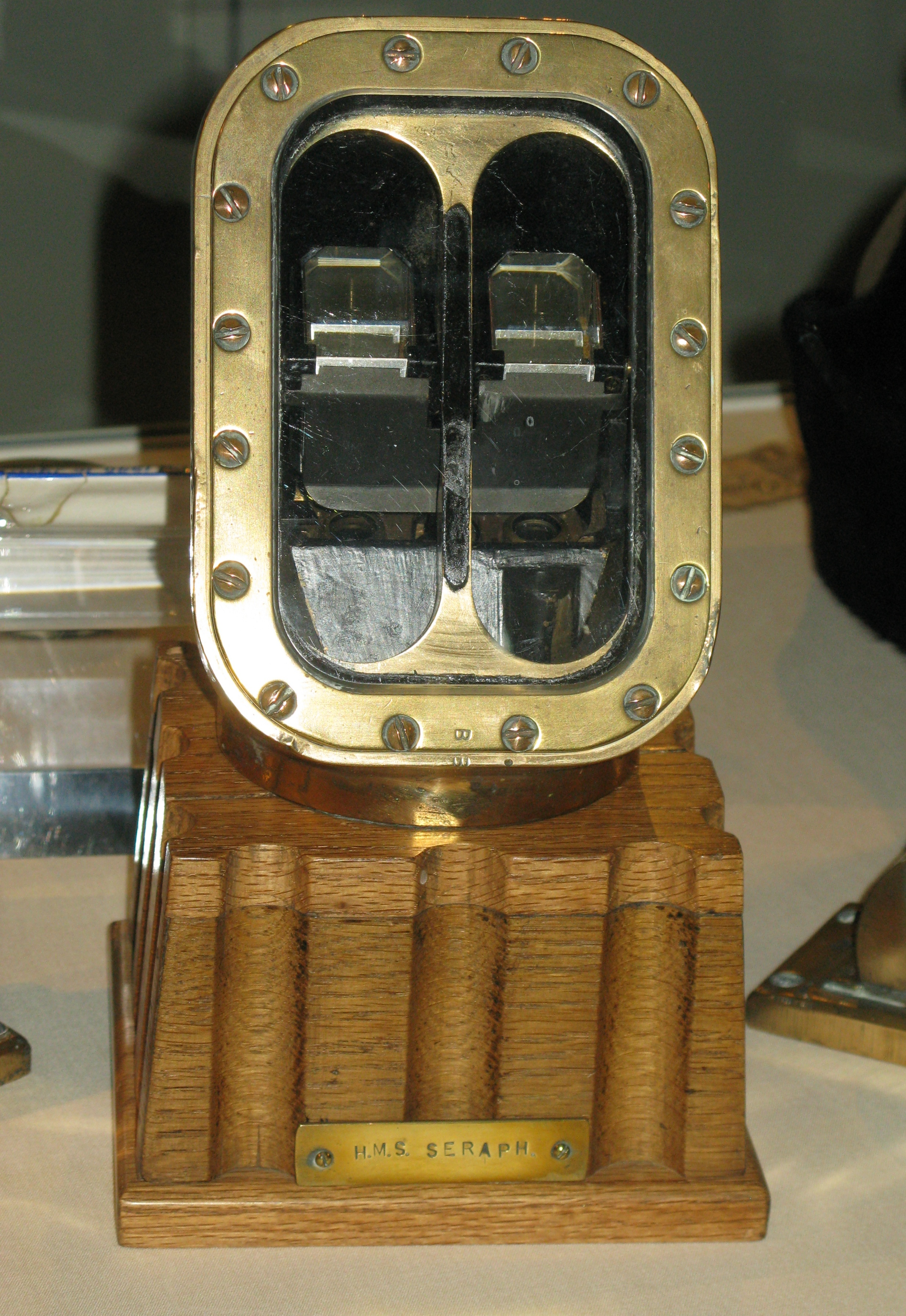
The head of HMS Seraph's search (navigation) periscope

In December 1943, she sailed to Chatham for a much needed refit. In March 1944, under Lt.Cdr. Trevor Russell-Walling, she carried out her final patrol in the English Channel, when she suffered accidental damage and was docked for repairs. During this time it was decided to convert her as a training boat for anti-submarine warfare operations.

The Admiralty had received intelligence in early 1944 about new U-boats which were reported to be able to achieve a top speed of around 16 knots (30 km/h) underwater, compared to the 9 knots (17 km/h) of the fastest existing U-boats. As these new XXI-class U-boats were considered to pose a major threat, Seraph was modified at Devonport as a matter of urgency to have a high underwater speed so that trials and exercises could be carried out against a submarine having a similar underwater speed; for example in developing new tactics.

The submarine was streamlined by careful attention to the attachments on the outside of the hull, the size of the bridge reduced, the gun was removed along with one of the periscopes and the radar mast, and torpedo tubes blanked over. The motors were upgraded and higher-capacity batteries fitted along with replacement of the propellers with the coarser pitched type used on the larger T class submarines.

Trials and ASW exercises were carried out in September and October 1944, giving an insight into the difficulties and possible remedies to the new underwater menace.

== After the war ==
Seraph remained in active service after the war. In 1955 she was fitted with armour plating and used as a torpedo target boat. She was attached to a squadron commanded by her first skipper, now Captain David Jewell. Also during this time, Seraph appeared as herself in the British film The Man Who Never Was (1956), which details her exploits during Operation Mincemeat. Her identifying marks are visible in a number of scenes during the film.

She remained in commission until 25 October 1962, 21 years to the day after her launching.

When she arrived at Briton Ferry for scrapping on 20 December 1962, parts from her conning tower and a torpedo loading hatch were preserved as a memorial at The Citadel in Charleston, South Carolina, where General Clark served as president from 1954–1965. This monument is the only shore installation in the United States where the Royal Navy ensign is authorised to be permanently flown by the British Admiralty. It flies alongside the US flag to commemorate Anglo-American cooperation during World War II.
