= Robert Dennison (United States Navy officer) =

Robert L. Dennison
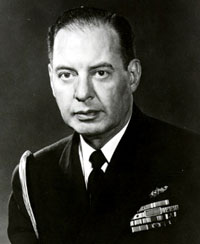
- Admiral Robert L. Dennison
- Born: April 13, 1901; Warren, Pennsylvania, U.S.
- Died: March 14, 1980 (aged 78); Bethesda, Maryland, U.S.
- Military career
- Allegiance: United States
- Branch: United States Navy
- Service years: 1923–1963
- Rank: Admiral
- Nickname: Robert Lee
- Commands: United States Atlantic Command; United States Atlantic Fleet; USS Missouri (BB-63)
- Conflicts: World War II
- Awards: Navy Distinguished Service Medal; Legion of Merit

Admiral Robert Lee Dennison (April 13, 1901 – March 14, 1980) was an American naval officer and aide to President Harry Truman.

== Early life ==
Dennison was born in Warren, Pennsylvania, and graduated from the United States Naval Academy in 1923. He later received a doctorate in engineering from Johns Hopkins University.

== Naval career ==
Dennison held numerous commands in the United States Navy, including submarines, destroyers, and the USS Missouri (BB-63). Truman twice sailed on the Missouri while Dennison commanded it. He was a naval aide to Harry Truman from 1948 to 1953.

Arleigh Burke, a former classmate of Dennison's who would one day become Chief of Naval Operations, found his career on the brink of ruin, following the Revolt of the Admirals. At the request of Dennison, Truman became involved. As a result, Burke's career stayed on track.

Dennison was involved in some of the first American continuity of government planning operations. He was the Commander in Chief of the United States Atlantic Fleet and United States Atlantic Command from February 28, 1960 to April 30, 1963. While in charge of the Atlantic forces, he was given the duty of blockading Cuba during the Cuban Missile Crisis.

Dennison died of a pulmonary embolism in 1980 at the Bethesda Naval Hospital.

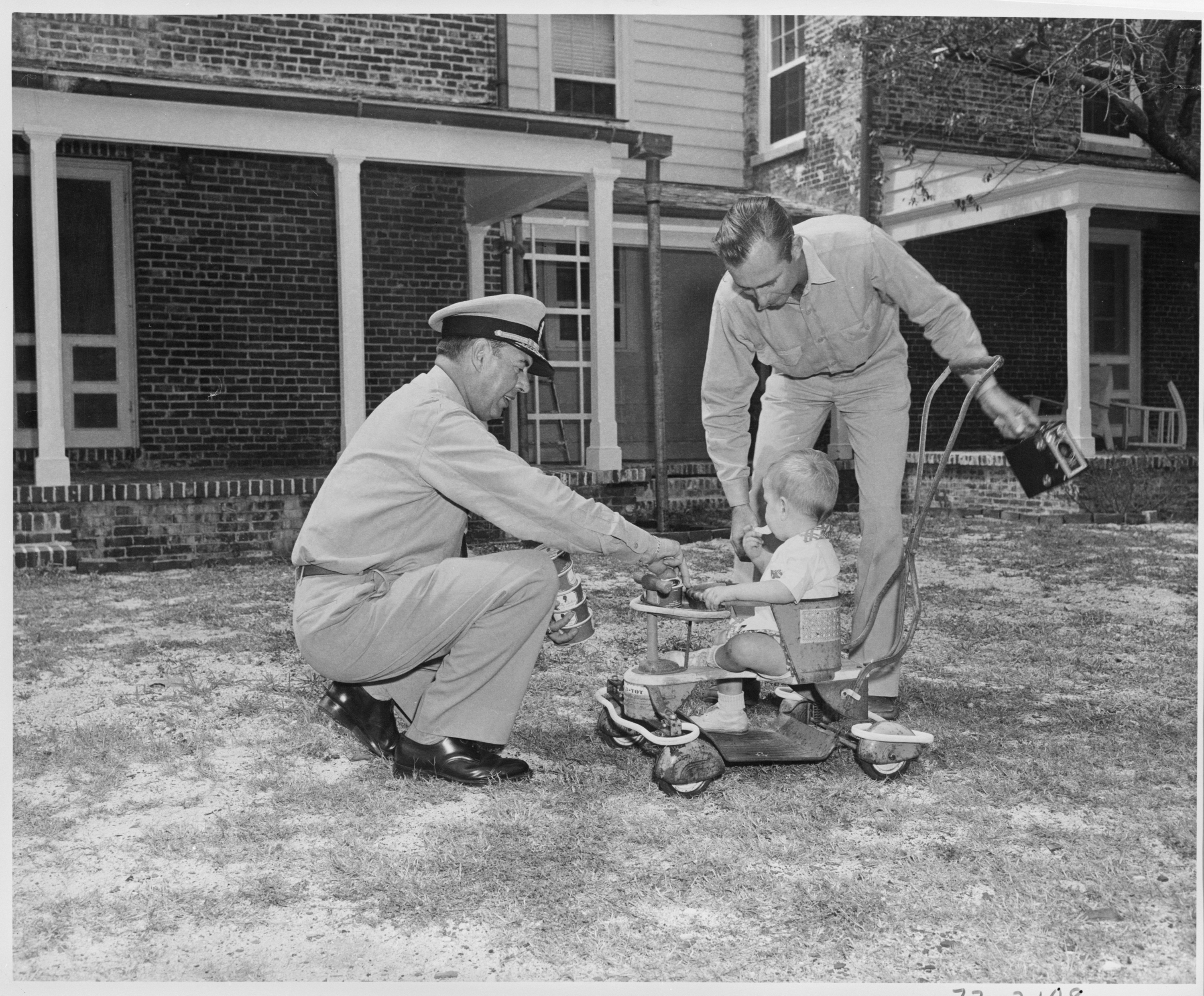
Robert Dennison and his photographer giving ice cream to a child at Fort Jefferson National Monument, 1951
