= Bill Jewell =

Royal Navy officer

Captain Bill Jewell MBE DSC
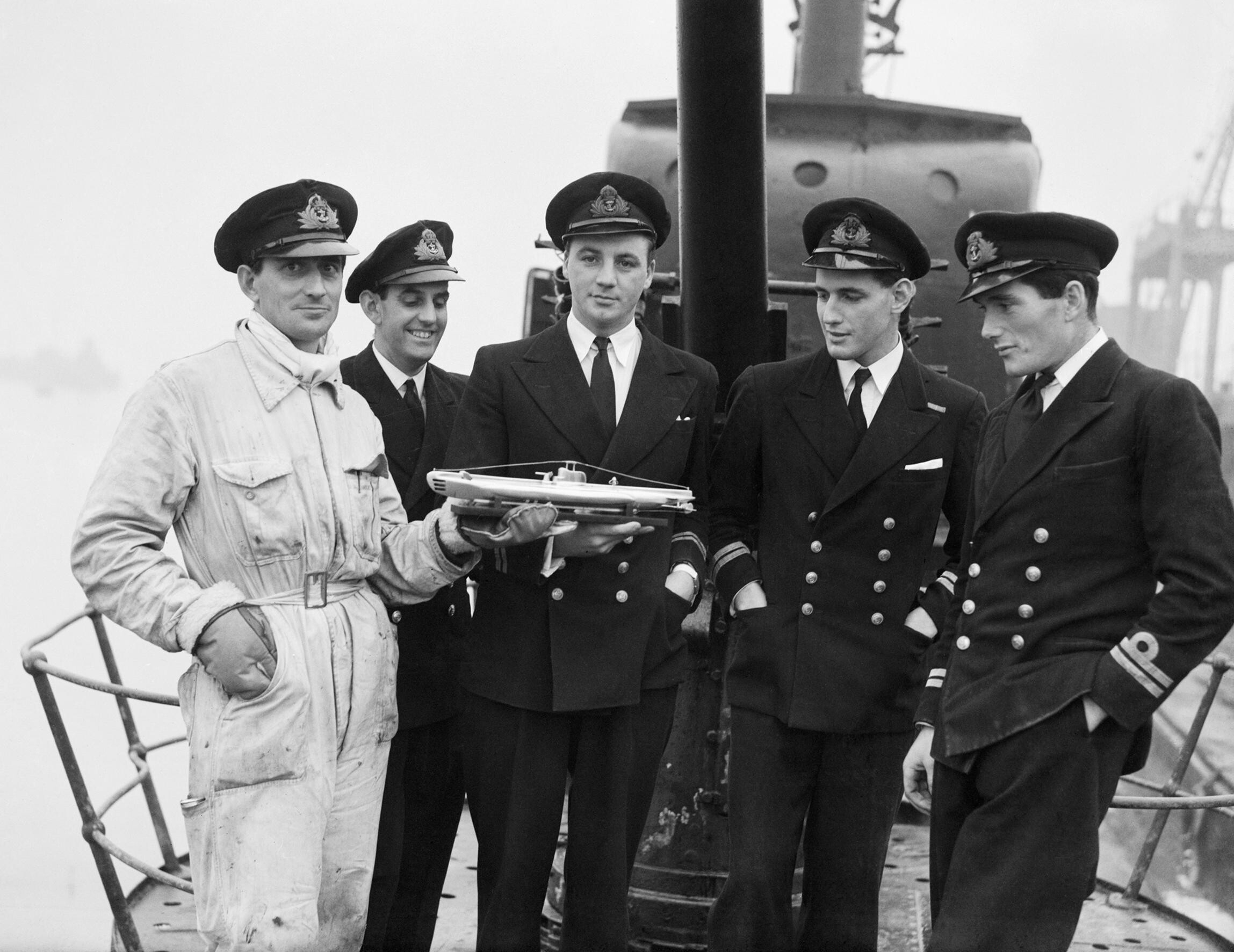
- The officers of HMS Seraph, on board the Royal Navy submarine in December 1943; Jewell, the commanding officer, is second from the right.

Personal details
- Born: Norman Limbury Auchinleck Jewell; 24 October 1913 Mahé, Seychelles
- Died: 18 August 2004 (aged 90)

Norman "Bill" Limbury Auchinleck Jewell (24 October 1913 – 18 August 2004) was an officer in the Royal Navy.

As commander of the submarine HMS Seraph, Jewell was involved in an act of deception during the Second World War. The story of Operation Mincemeat, as the plan was known, became the subject of several books and two films.

== Early life ==
Jewell was born on Mahé in the Seychelles on 24 October 1913 where his father was a doctor and a colonial officer. His father left his family in the Seychelles to join the British Army in East Africa during the First World War. At the end of the war, the family moved to Kenya and Jewell was sent to prep school in England and finally Oundle School before joining the Navy in 1936.

== Naval career ==
Jewell served on HMS Osiris and HMS Otway, and in November 1940 joined HMS Truant commanded by Lt-Cdr Haggard. Haggard was constantly seeking the enemy and was something of a mentor to Jewell. On one occasion Haggard disobeyed orders not to approach within 15 miles (24 km) of Tripoli but in fact penetrated a dense minefield by following an Italian minelayer. Six months later he led battleships of the Mediterranean Fleet through the same minefield to bombard Tripoli.

On 27 May 1942, Jewell took command of Seraph and its 44-man crew, little realising what part it would play in naval history.

Seraph was chosen to take the American General Mark Clark and his staff to talks with Vichy French officers in Algeria. This was known as Operation Flagpole (World War II). On 19 October Jewell landed Clark's party in small collapsible canoes about 50 miles (80 km) west of Algiers, with three members of the British Special Boat Section paddling them in. Seraph spent a day lying submerged in deep water. After dark, Jewell took her in until there was less than 10 ft (3 m) of water under the keel. The sea was too rough to recover the boats from the beach; so Jewell took Seraph in until she was almost aground. Clark and his party then dashed for the boats, paddled hard through the surf, and were hauled on board; Seraph reached Gibraltar on 25 October.

== Operation Mincemeat ==
His most famous mission was Operation Mincemeat. The intention was to deceive the Germans about Allied intentions to invade Italy in 1943. It became the subject of several books, and two films, The Man Who Never Was and Operation Mincemeat.

The ruse involved dropping a corpse, dressed in a Royal Marines major's uniform, with a briefcase chained to its wrist stuffed with "secret" papers containing disinformation, into the Mediterranean near the coast of Spain, a neutral but Axis-leaning nation, to deceive the Germans. The body was transported in a metal container packed with dry ice by Jewell in his submarine. On 30 April 1943, just off the port of Huelva in Spain, Jewell surfaced. He had never performed a burial at sea, but aptly chose Psalm 39 (..."I will keep my mouth with a bridle, while the wicked is before me").

== Later career and retirement ==
In 1948, Jewell became Captain 3rd Submarine Flotilla. He was a director of the RN Staff College at Greenwich and also worked on Mountbatten's staff. He retired in 1963, and worked for the Mitchell and Butler brewery in Birmingham, where he was also life president of the Submarine Old Comrades' Association.

== Awards and decorations ==
- MiD (1941)
- MBE (1943)
- DSC (1944)
- Legion of Merit (1945)
- Croix de Guerre with Palm (1946)

== Personal life ==
Jewell married, at Pinner, Middlesex, in July 1944 Rosemary Patricia Galloway, a WRNS cipher officer. They had met at Algiers when she was stationed there after arriving in port after his part in Operation Mincemeat. The couple remained married until her death 53 years later. Their two sons and a daughter survived him.

== Death ==
In 1998, when he was 85, Jewell suffered a serious fall and was paralysed from the neck down. He spent the remainder of his life at the Royal Star and Garter Home, Richmond. He died on 18 August 2004 aged 90.
