= Shirase =

Shirase may refer to:

- Shirase Nobu (1861–1946), Japanese explorer
- Japanese icebreaker Shirase (AGB-5002), a ship operated by the Japan Maritime Self-Defense Force, decommissioned in July 2008
- Japanese icebreaker Shirase (AGB-5003), a ship which succeeded to the above
- Shirase Coast, Antarctica
- Shirase Glacier, Antarctica
- Shirase Bank, Antarctica
- Battle Programmer Shirase, an anime series
