= Japanese icebreaker Fuji (AGB-5001) =

Icebreaker of the JMSDF

Coordinates: 35.0906580°N 136.8805070°E

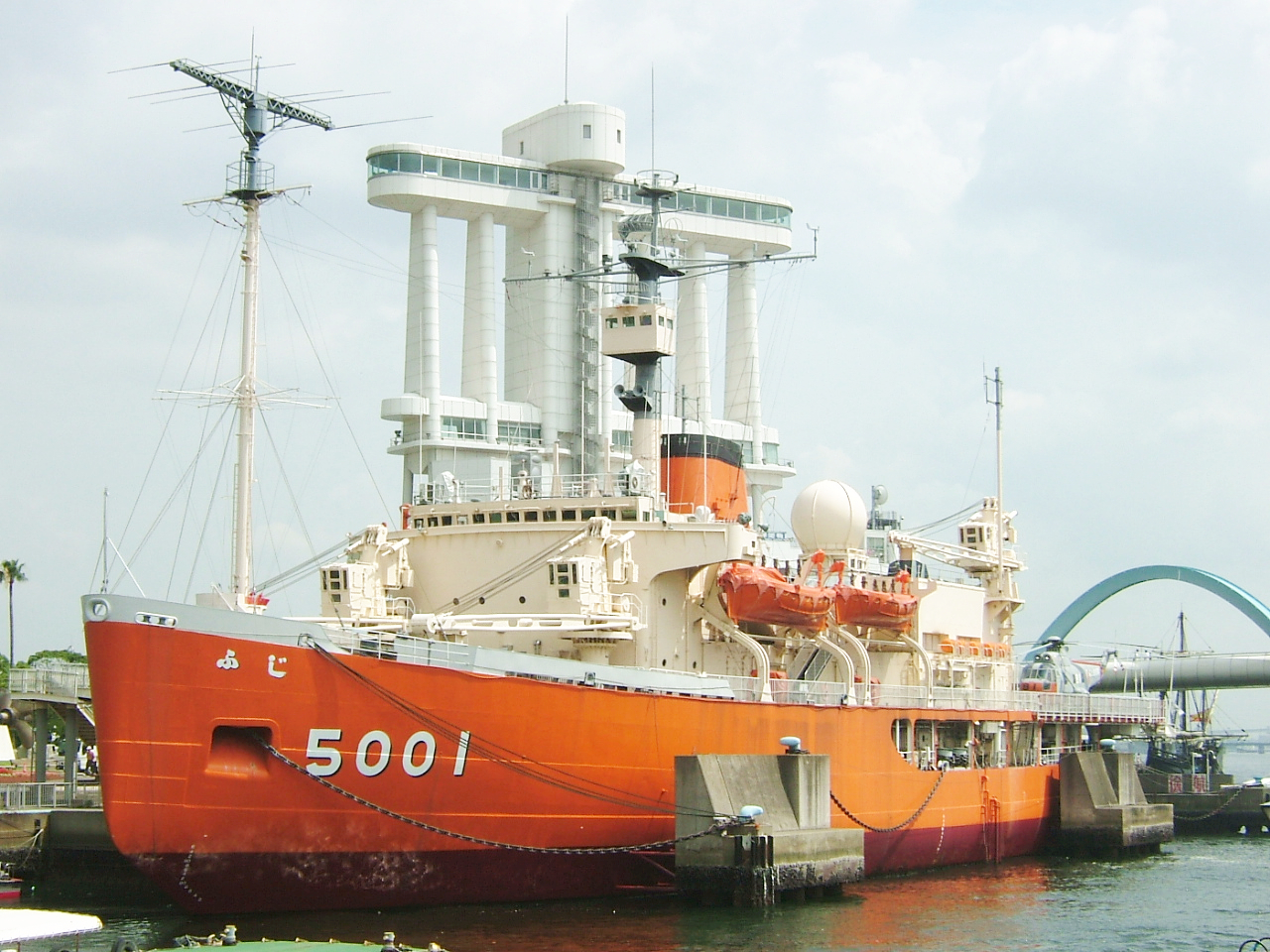
- Fuji as a museum ship

History

Japan
- Name: Fuji; (ふじ)
- Namesake: Mount Fuji
- Builder: Nippon Kokan, Yokohama
- Laid down: 28 August 1964
- Launched: 18 March 1965
- Commissioned: 15 July 1965
- Decommissioned: 11 April 1984
- Home port: Yokosuka
- Identification: Pennant number: AGB-5001
- Status: Museum ship at Antarctic Museum and Former Research Ship Fuji, Nagoya

Class overview
- Preceded by: Sōya class
- Succeeded by: Shirase class (1981)

General characteristics
- Type: Icebreaker
- Displacement: 5,250 t (5,170 long tons) standard; 9,120 t (8,980 long tons) full load
- Length: 100 m (328 ft 1 in)
- Beam: 22 m (72 ft 2 in)
- Draft: 8.3 m (27 ft 3 in)
- Depth: 11.8 m (38 ft 9 in)
- Propulsion: 2 × diesel electric engines; 2 × shafts
- Speed: 17.2 kn (31.9 km/h; 19.8 mph)
- Range: 1,500 nmi (2,800 km) at 15 kn (28 km/h; 17 mph)
- Complement: 235
- Sensors & processing systems: OPS-4D navigational radar; OPS-16 surface-search radar; SQS-11A sonar; OQN-4 ground-penetrating radar
- Armament: 1 × twin Oerlikon 40mm gun; 2 × single Oerlikon 20mm guns; 1 × Hedgehog; 2 × K cannons
- Aircraft carried: 2 × S-61A-1; 1 × Bell 47G2A
- Aviation facilities: Hangar and helipad

Fuji (AGB-5001) was an icebreaker of the Japan Maritime Self-Defense Force (JMSDF) in the mid-1960s. She is now a museum ship in Nagoya.

== Construction and career ==
Fuji was laid down on 28 August 1964 and launched on 18 March 1965 by the Nippon Kokan Yokohama Shipyard. She was commissioned on 15 July 1965 and was homeported in Yokosuka.

On 20 November 1965, she left Tokyo at Harumi Pier and received a container containing messages and newspapers dropped by the 1st Fleet Air Corps P2V-7 on the southeastern sea of Amami Oshima. During the voyage, while conducting departmental training, an offshore memorial service was held off the coast of the Philippines for the war dead of World War II. On 5 December, she called at Fremantle. During the port call, maintenance, supply, rest and goodwill events were carried out, and the ship departed on the 11th. On the 17th, it passed 55 ° S and entered the Antarctic Circle. On the 20th, the rust prevention of the aircraft was released, and on the 27th, the drift ice margining off Syowa Station and the entry into the drift ice area began. It reached 31 degrees 38 nautical miles of fast ice from Syowa Station on the 30th, and started full-scale air transportation on 3 January 1966, and Syowa Station was reopened on the 20th. From the 25th, in parallel with air transportation, she entered the inner part of Luzoholm Bay, and on the 27th, she berthed at Syowa Station, landed snowmobiles and large supplies, and completed the transportation of all 435 tons of supplies. 1 February The 7th Wintering Corps was established. On the same day, Fuji left Syowa Station, left the drift ice edge on the 2nd, visited the Soviet Union's base on the 3rd, met with the Obi on the same day, departed from the base on the 6th, started westbound, and left the Lower Board One base in Belgium on the 10th. Visited, left Antarctica on the 13th and headed for Cape Town. Passing 55 ° S on the 18th, arriving in Cape Town on the 24th, departing on 3 March, arriving in Colombo on the 19th, departing on the 23rd. Returned to Tokyo Harumi Pier on 8 April. She was on the expedition for 140 days.

On 3 July 1978, she participated in the launching ceremony of the Souya. On 31 December of the same year, during the 29th Red and White Song Battle, a phone call was made inside the Fuji before Hachiro Kasuga sang goodbye.

On 25 November 1982, after receiving Souya's whistle in front of the Museum of Maritime Science, she was sent to Shirase and the 37th Escort Flotilla (Ayase and Chitose) who took office on 12 November in Tokyo Bay and went to the last Antarctic line. This was the first mission of Shirase's self-defense ship. In December 1982, she was ranked 12th in the world in of icebreakers in the world as stipulated by Canadian regulations.

On 20 April 1983, with the voyage to Harumi Wharf, the role of the Antarctic research ship was transferred to Shirase, and the role of the second generation Antarctic research ship was completed.

The number of days of action was 2,869, the number of transport personnel was 800, the transport volume was 8,529.5 tons, and the number of charges in the ice sea was 23,416.

Fuji was larger than its predecessor Sōya and had better icebreaking performance, but suffered many difficulties during the harsh Antarctic research mission. From the 7th to the 11th, we succeeded in berthing in a row, but on the return trip of the 11th action, after the accident of total breakage of 4 right propulsion wings, aging began to appear, and after that, we berthed at Syowa Station. Became only the 19th observation, and stayed at berthing 6 times out of 18 times, but even if he could not berth, he acted as planned and completed the mission.

== Gallery ==
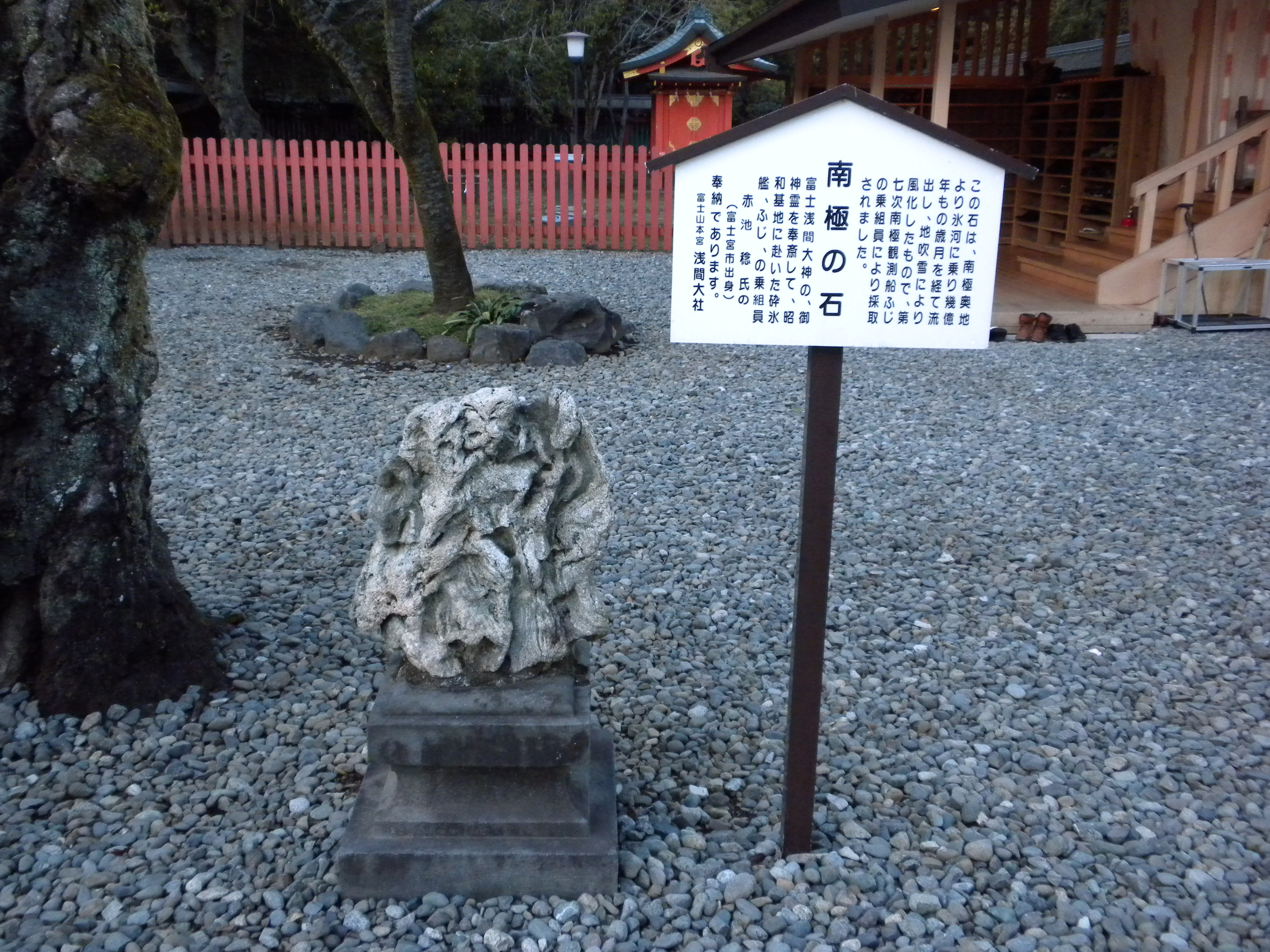
Antarctic rock recovered by Fuji on Mount Fuji

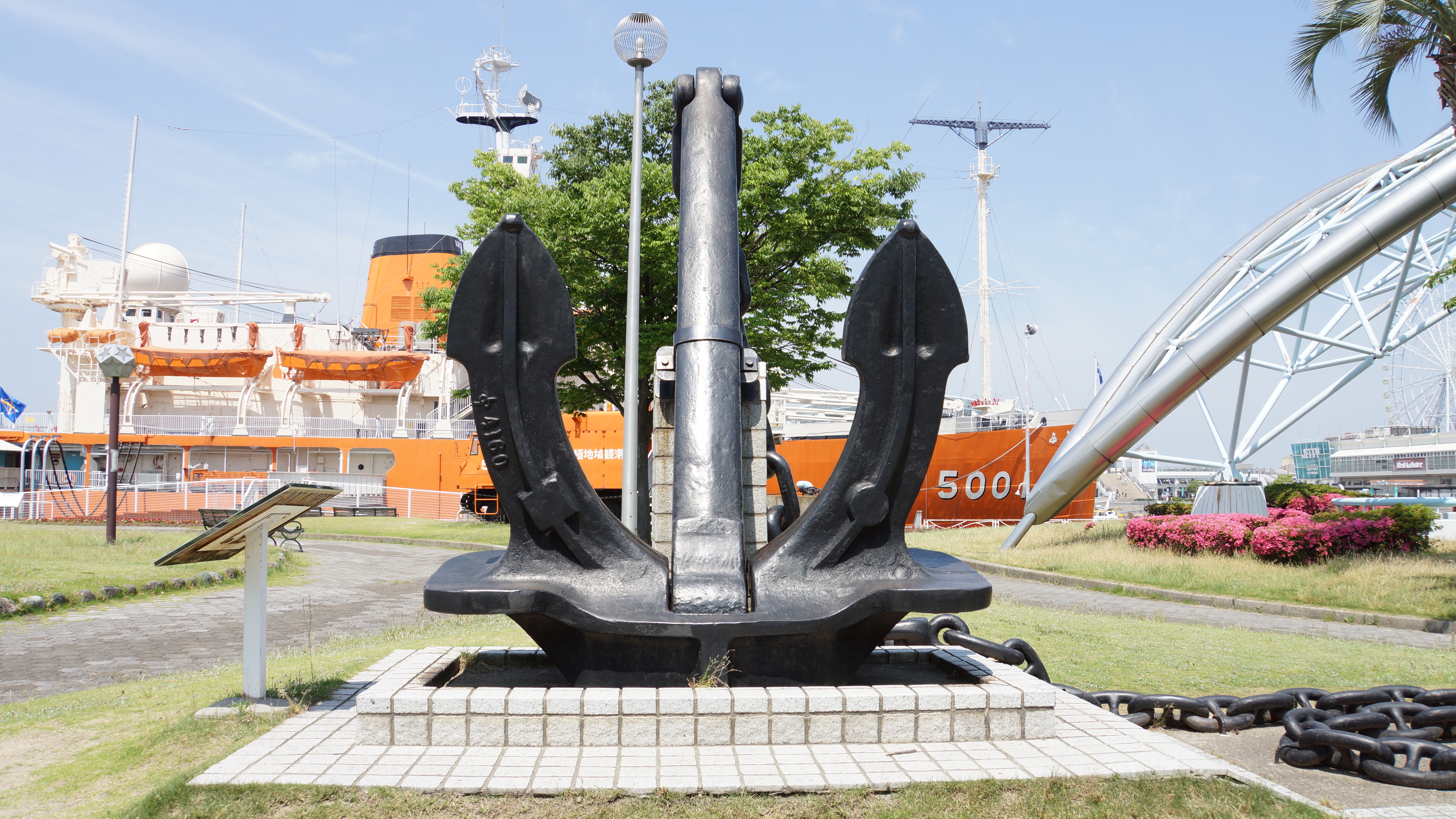
Anchor of Fuji

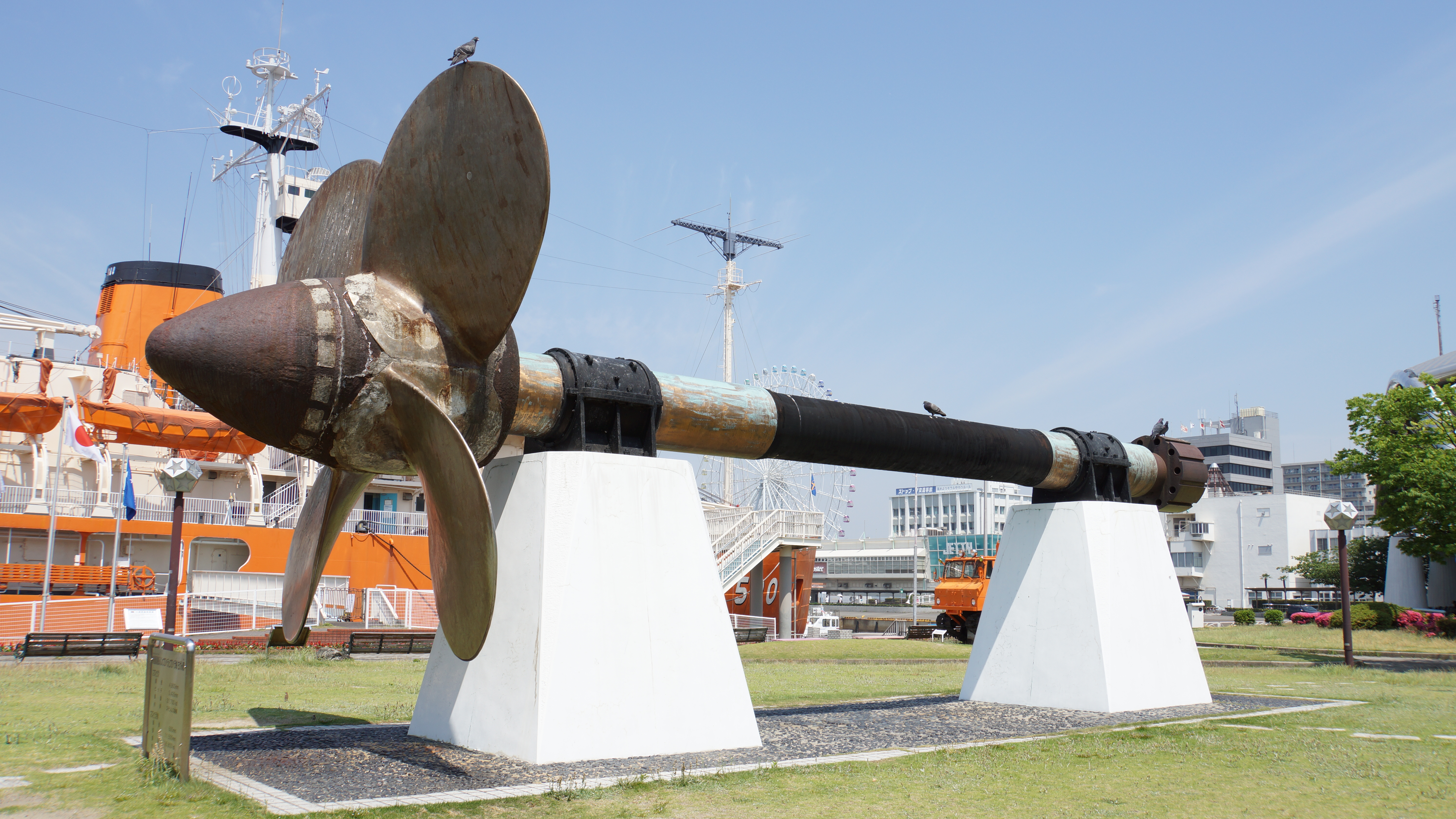
Propeller of Fuji

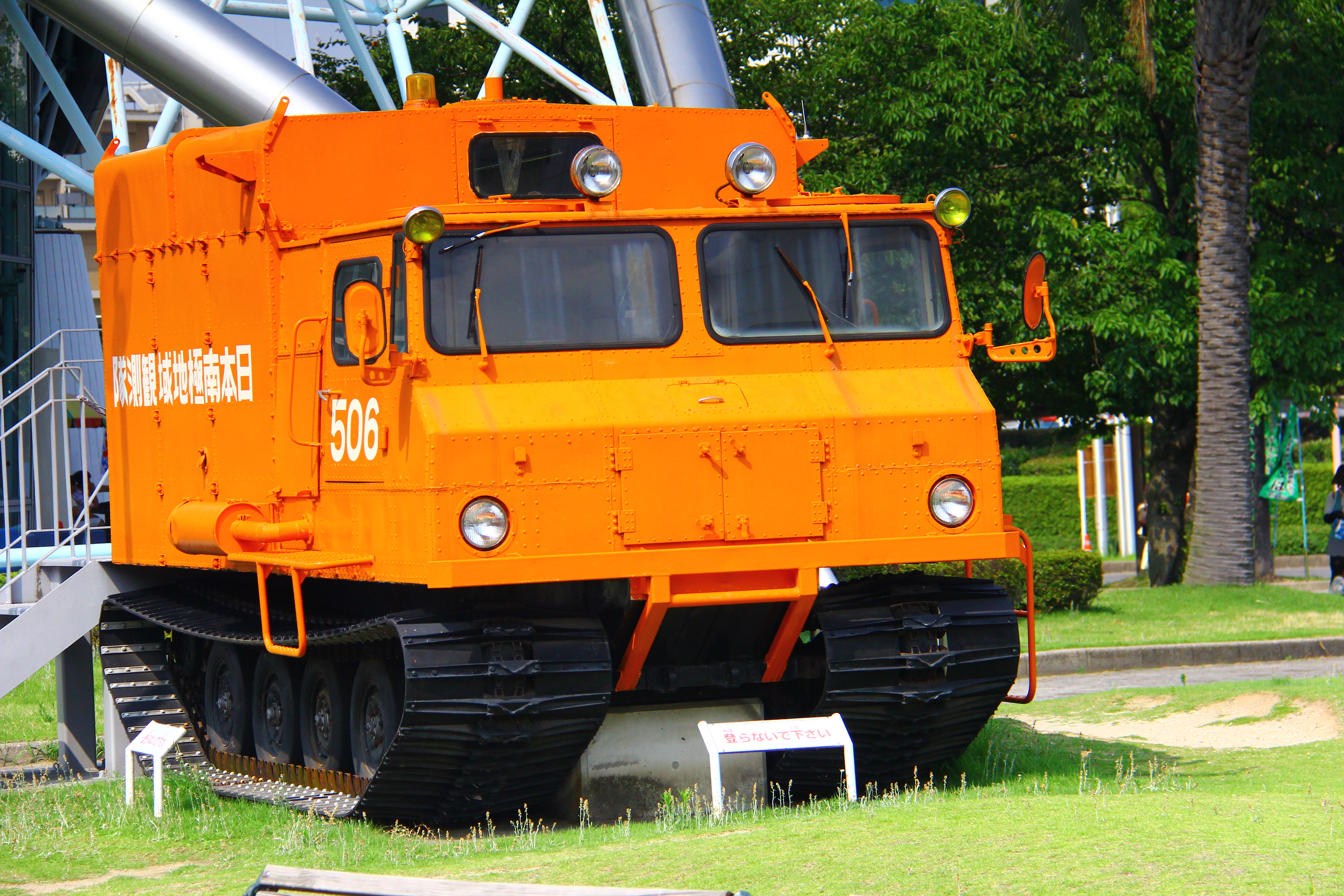

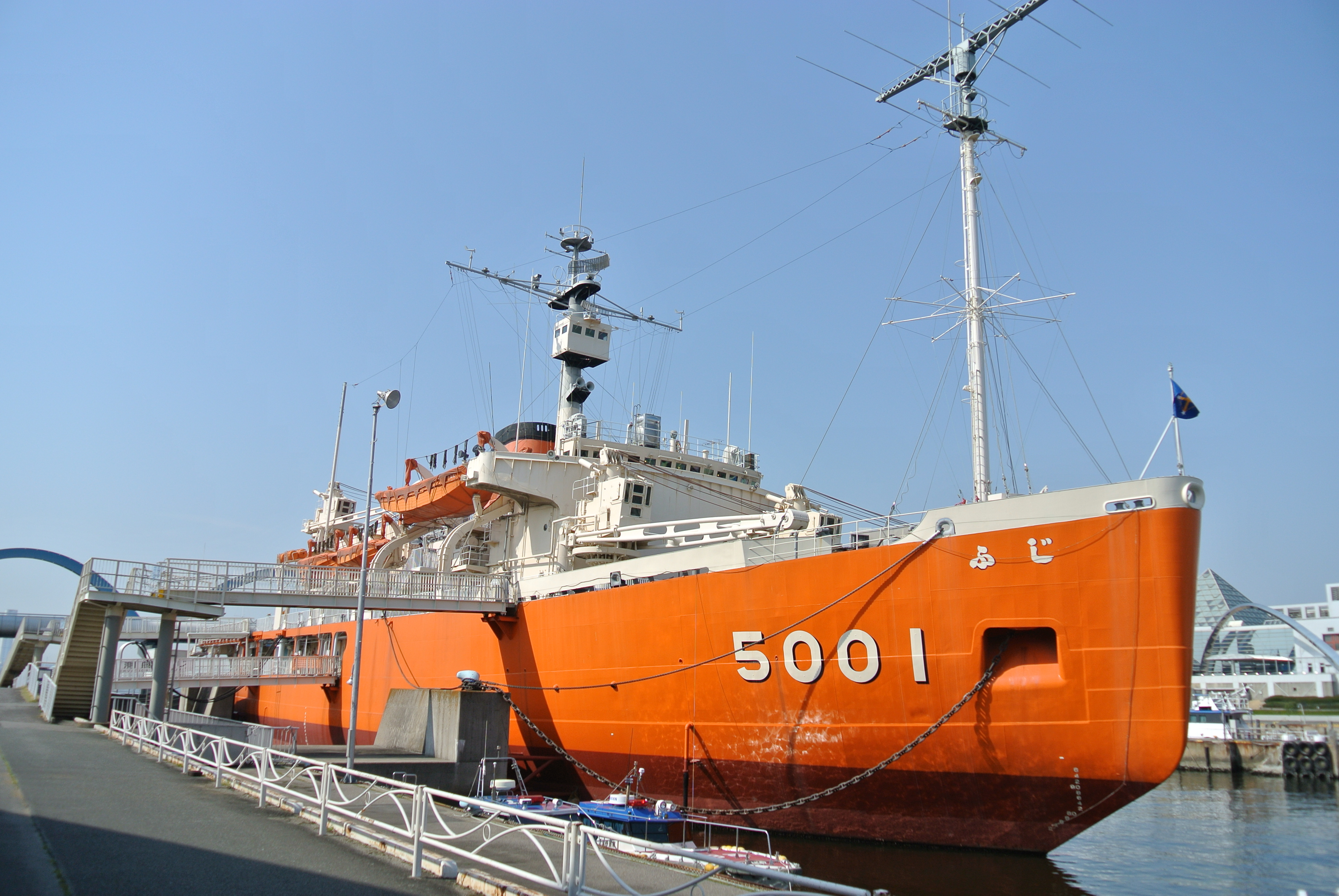

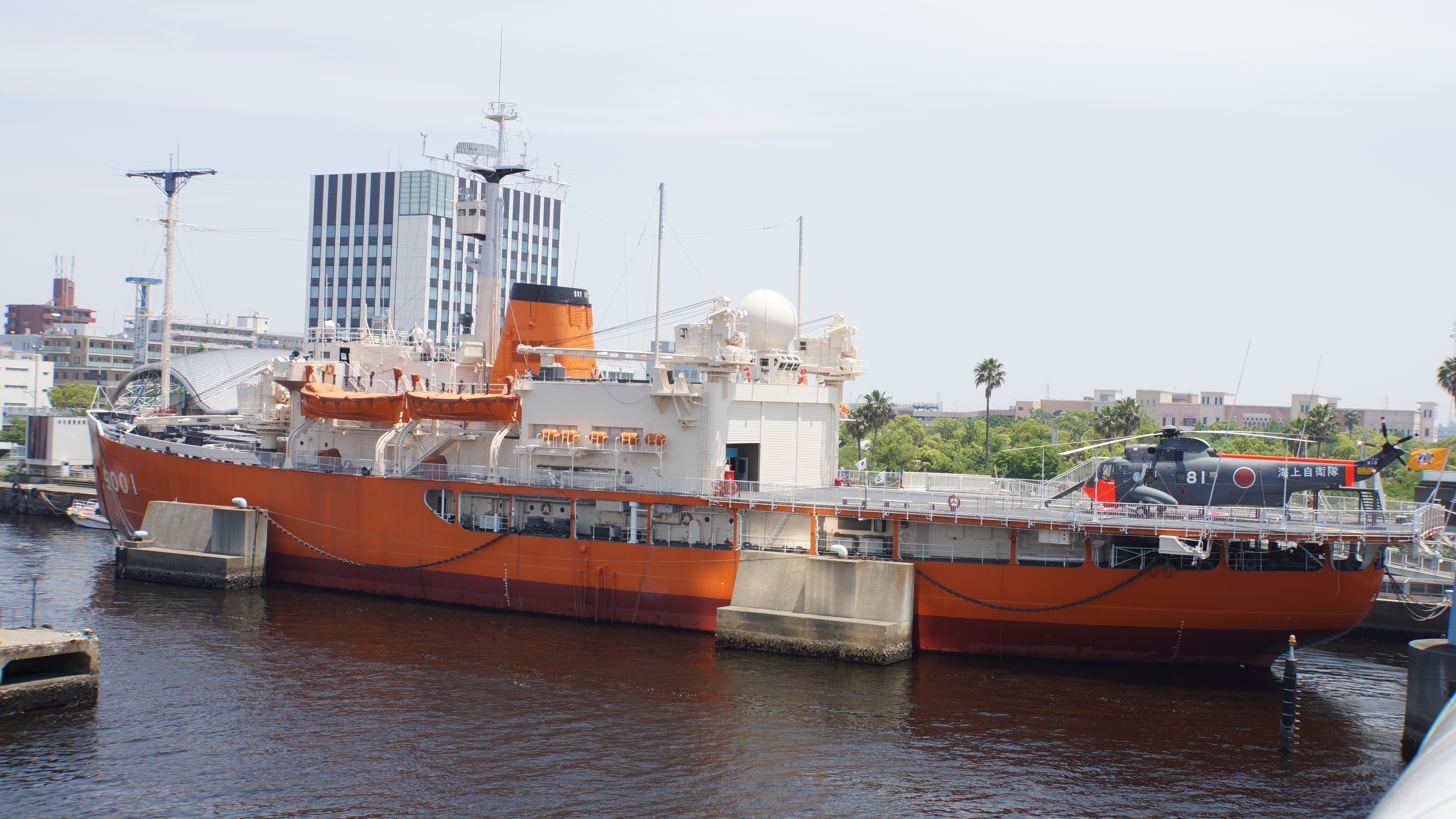

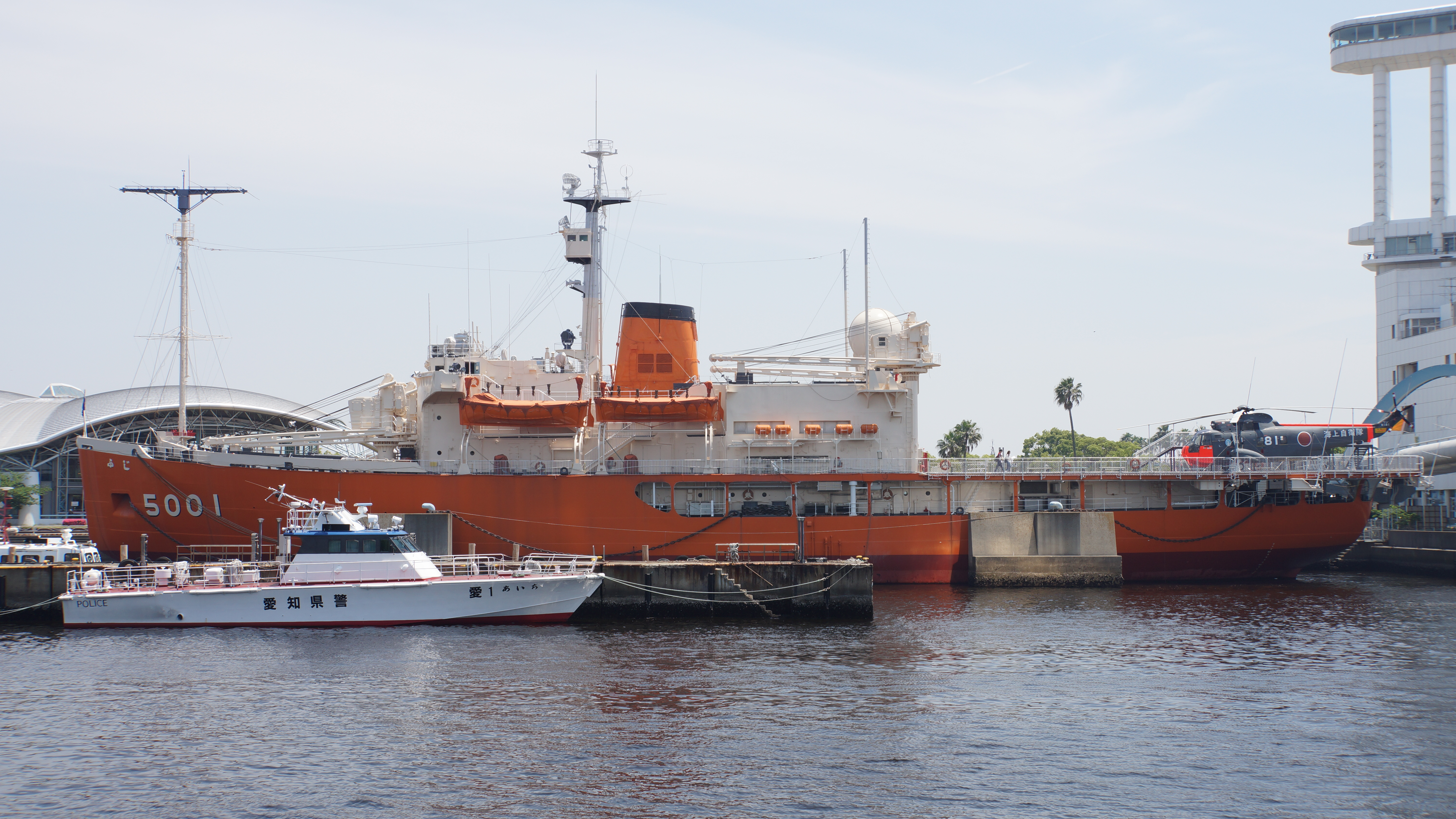

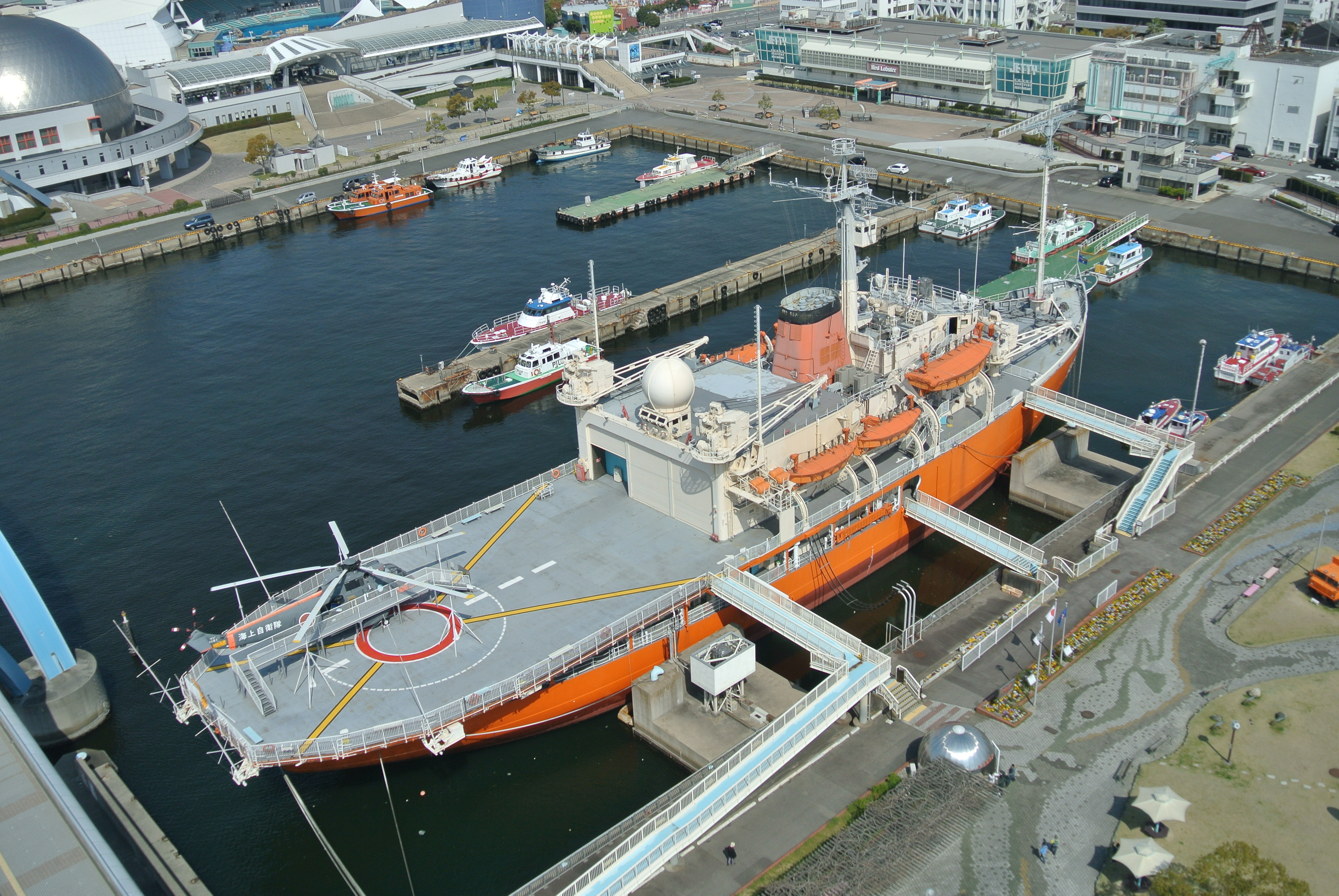

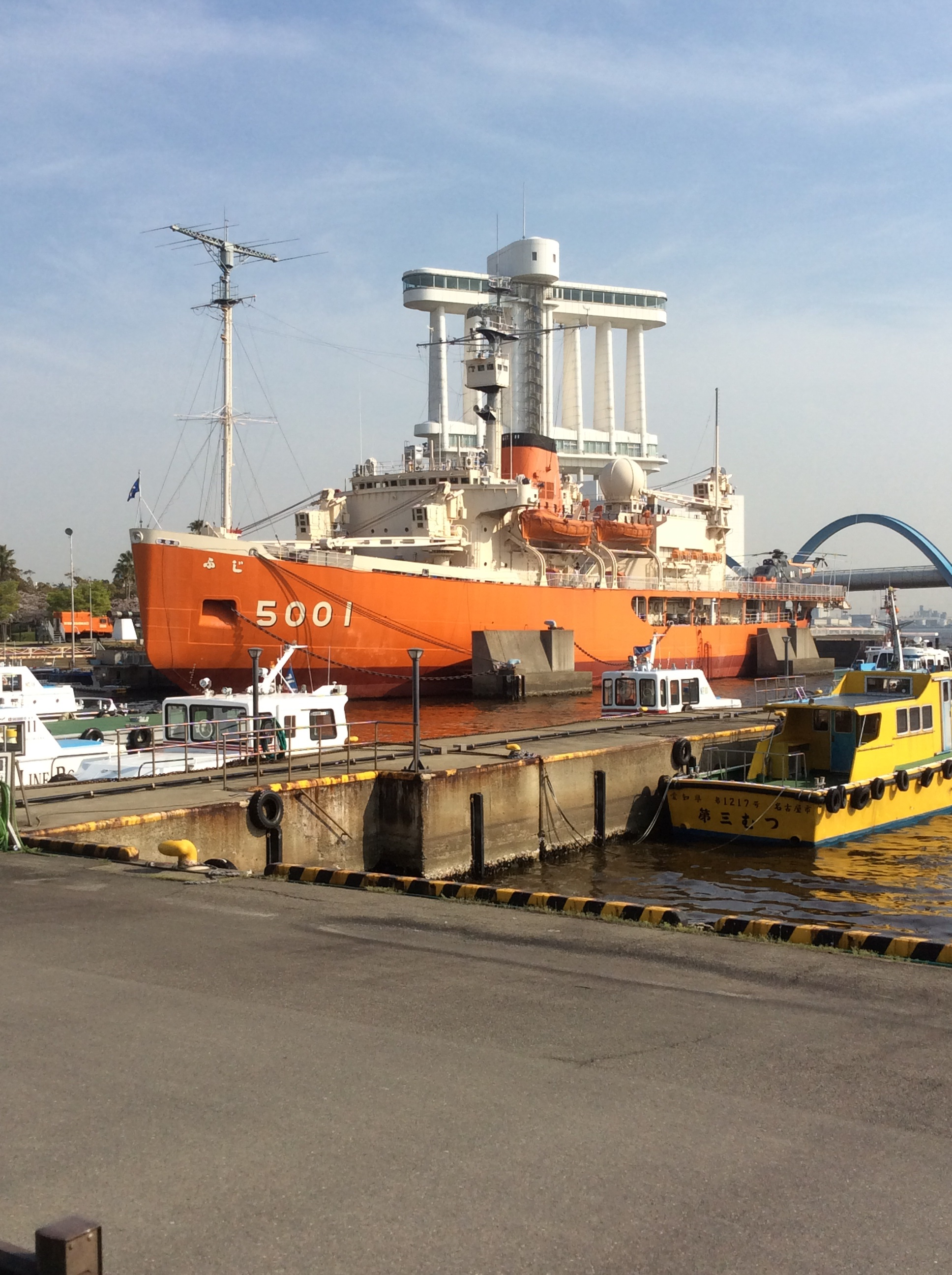

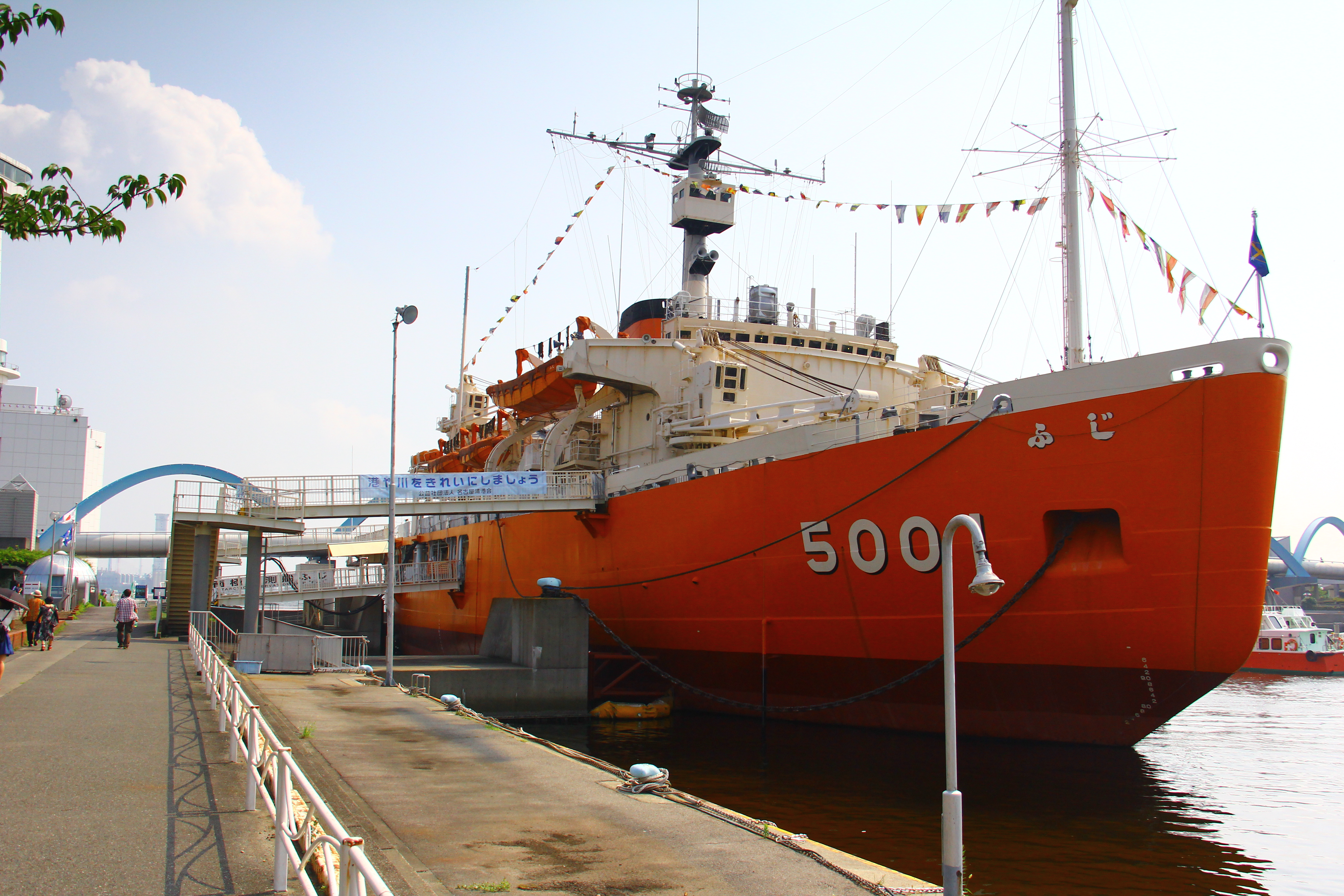

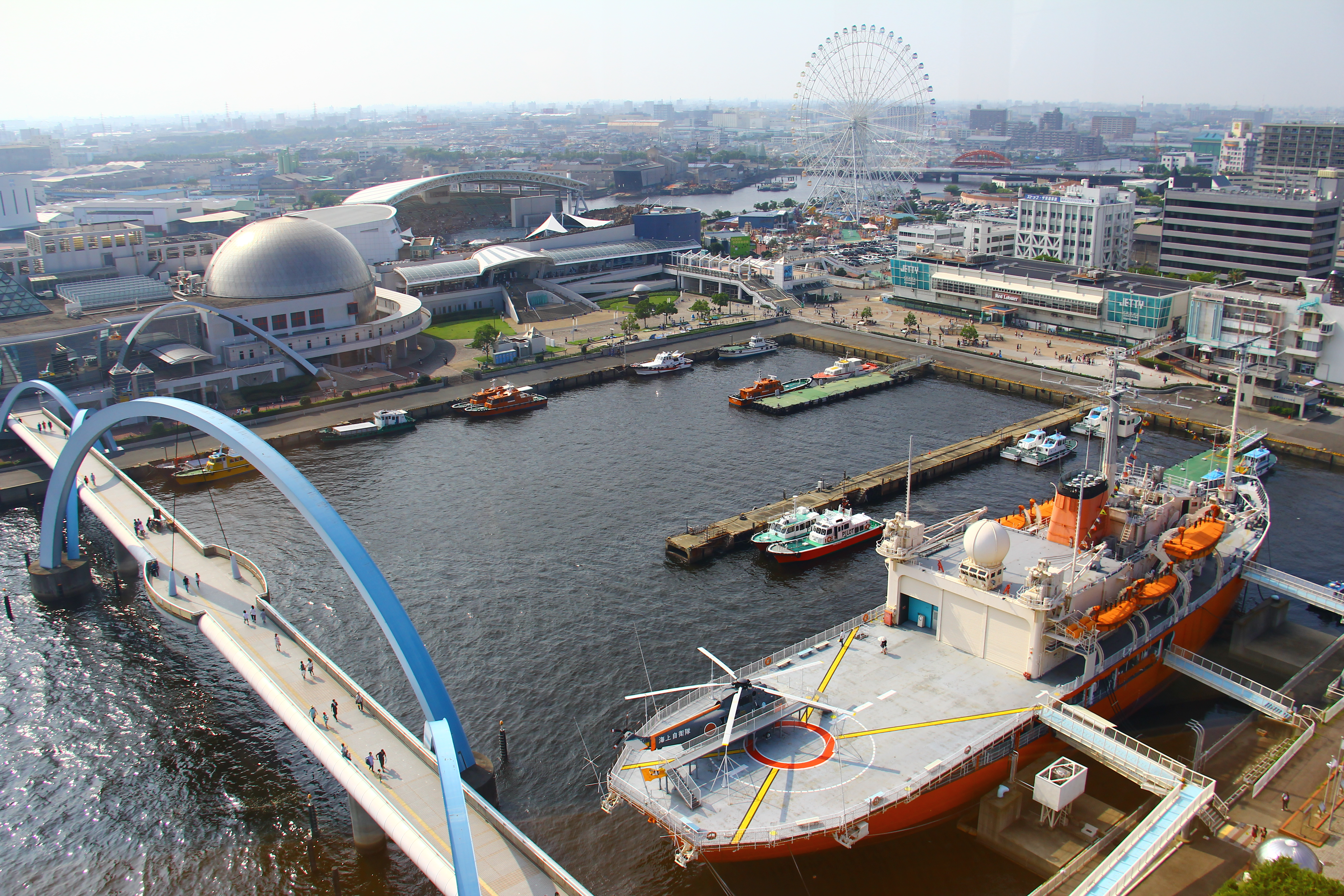

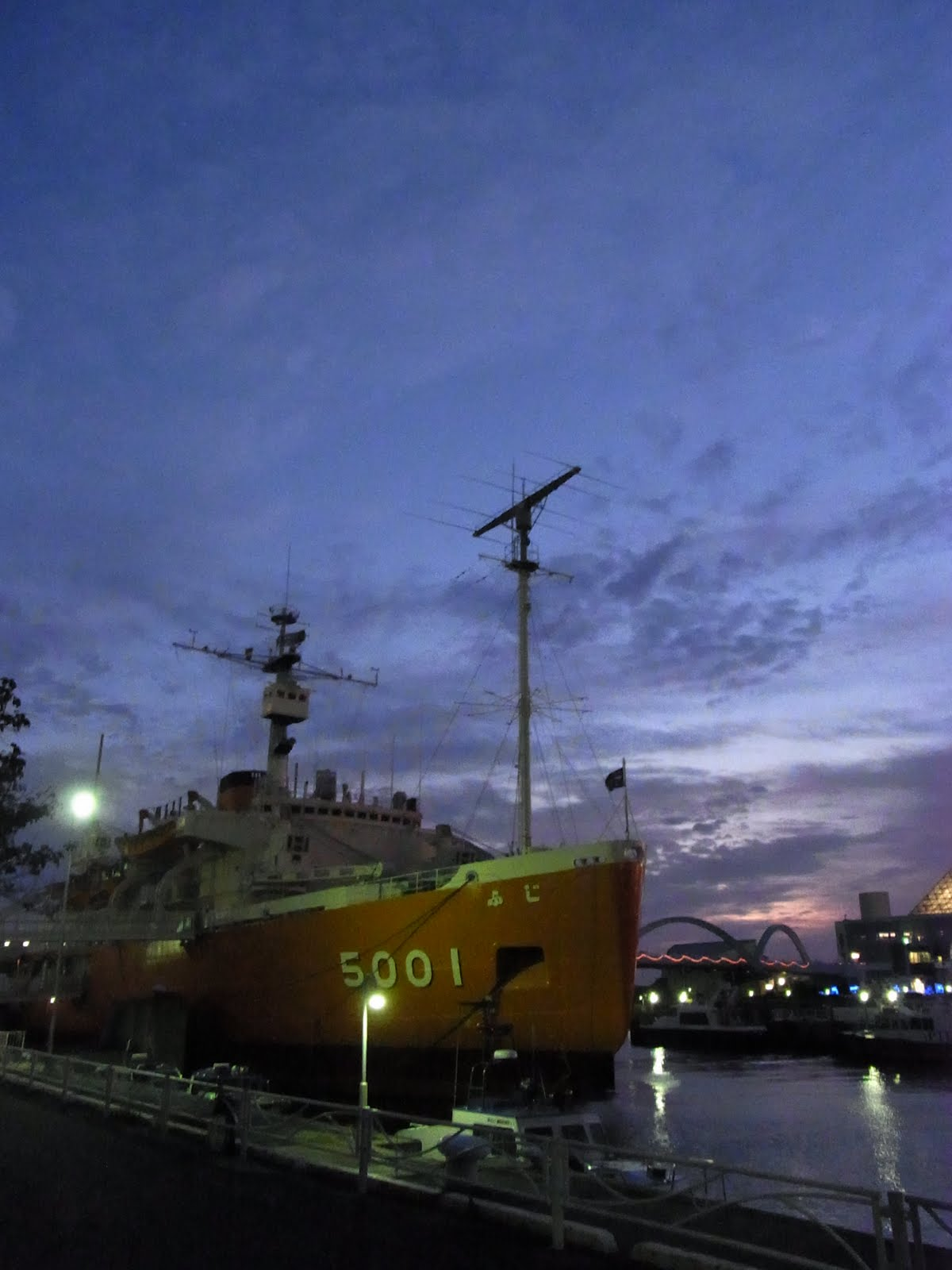
