= Japanese icebreaker Shirase (AGB-5003) =

Japanese Polar Icebreaker

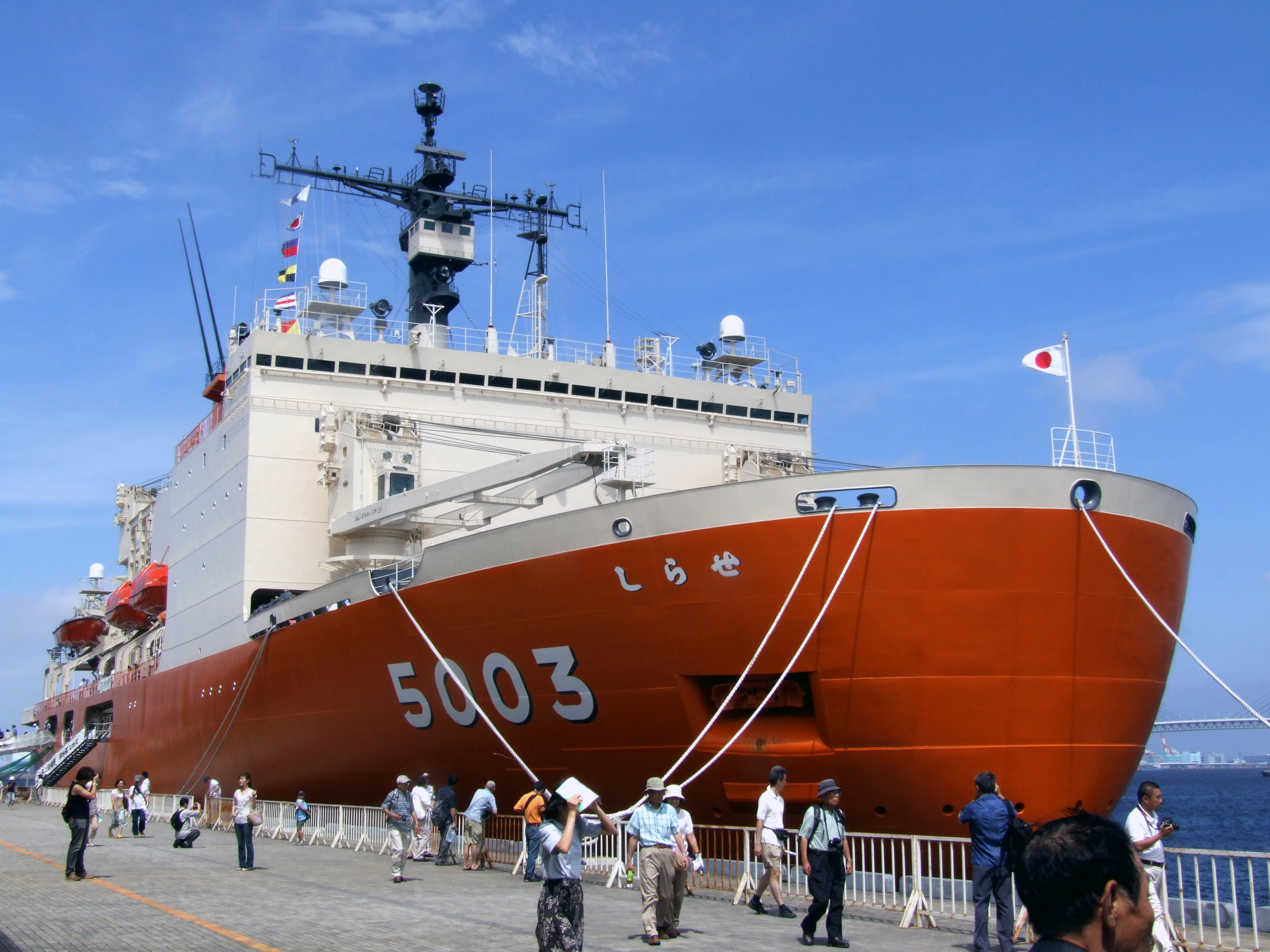
- Shirase (AGB-5003)

History

Japan
- Name: Shirase; (しらせ)
- Namesake: Shirase Glacier
- Laid down: 15 March 2007
- Launched: 16 April 2008
- Commissioned: 20 May 2009
- Home port: Yokosuka
- Identification: Hull number: AGB-5003; MMSI number: 431999533; Callsign: JSNJ
- Status: Active

Class overview
- Preceded by: Shirase class (1981)
- Succeeded by: N/A

General characteristics
- Type: Icebreaker
- Displacement: Approx. 20,000 tons
- Length: 138 m (452 ft 9 in)
- Beam: 28 m (91 ft 10 in)
- Draft: 9.2 m (30 ft 2 in)
- Propulsion: Diesel-electric; Four propulsion motors, 22,000 kW (30,000 hp) (combined); Two shafts; fixed-pitch propellers
- Speed: 19.5 knots (36.1 km/h; 22.4 mph) (maximum); 3 knots (5.6 km/h; 3.5 mph) in 1.5 m (4.9 ft) ice
- Capacity: 80 scientists; 1,100 tons of cargo
- Complement: 175
- Aircraft carried: 3 helicopters

Shirase (しらせ) is a Japanese icebreaker operated by the Japan Maritime Self-Defense Force and Japan's fourth icebreaker for Antarctic expeditions. She inherited her name from her predecessor.

She was launched in April 2008 and commissioned in May 2009 with the hull number AGB-5003. She began her first voyage on 10 November 2009.

== Name ==
In Japanese, the name "Shirase" is written in hiragana. Due to a JMSDF internal naming rule, an icebreaker must be named after a place. Accordingly, Shirase was named after the Shirase Glacier. This glacier bears the family name of Lieutenant Nobu Shirase, a Japanese pioneer in Antarctic exploration.

== Operations ==
In February 2013, the anti-whaling group Sea Shepherd Conservation Society claimed the Shirase was sent to monitor its interference with the Japanese cetacean research fleet. However, according to the National Institute of Polar Research, the icebreaker was in fact far to the west off the coast of Antarctica near the Showa Base at the time. The Japanese government subsequently confirmed that the vessel was not involved in any operation related to the whaling program, and that Sea Shepherd's claims were "completely fake".

On 17 February 2014, the Shirase ran aground just off the unmanned Molodyozhnaya Station in Antarctica. While the outer hull was penetrated, the vessel was in no danger of sinking and no fuel oil leakage was reported.

On August 17, 2017, a CH-101 helicopter of the Japan Maritime Self-Defense Force assigned to the Shirase crashed at Iwakuni Air Base in Yamaguchi Prefecture. Four crewmembers were injured.

== In popular culture ==
Shirase is the icebreaker that carries the protagonists of A Place Further than the Universe, a 2018 Japanese anime series, renamed "Penguin Manju Go" (ペンギン饅頭号) in the series, "Shirase" (報瀬) also being one of the main characters' name.
