= Japanese icebreaker Shirase (AGB-5002) =

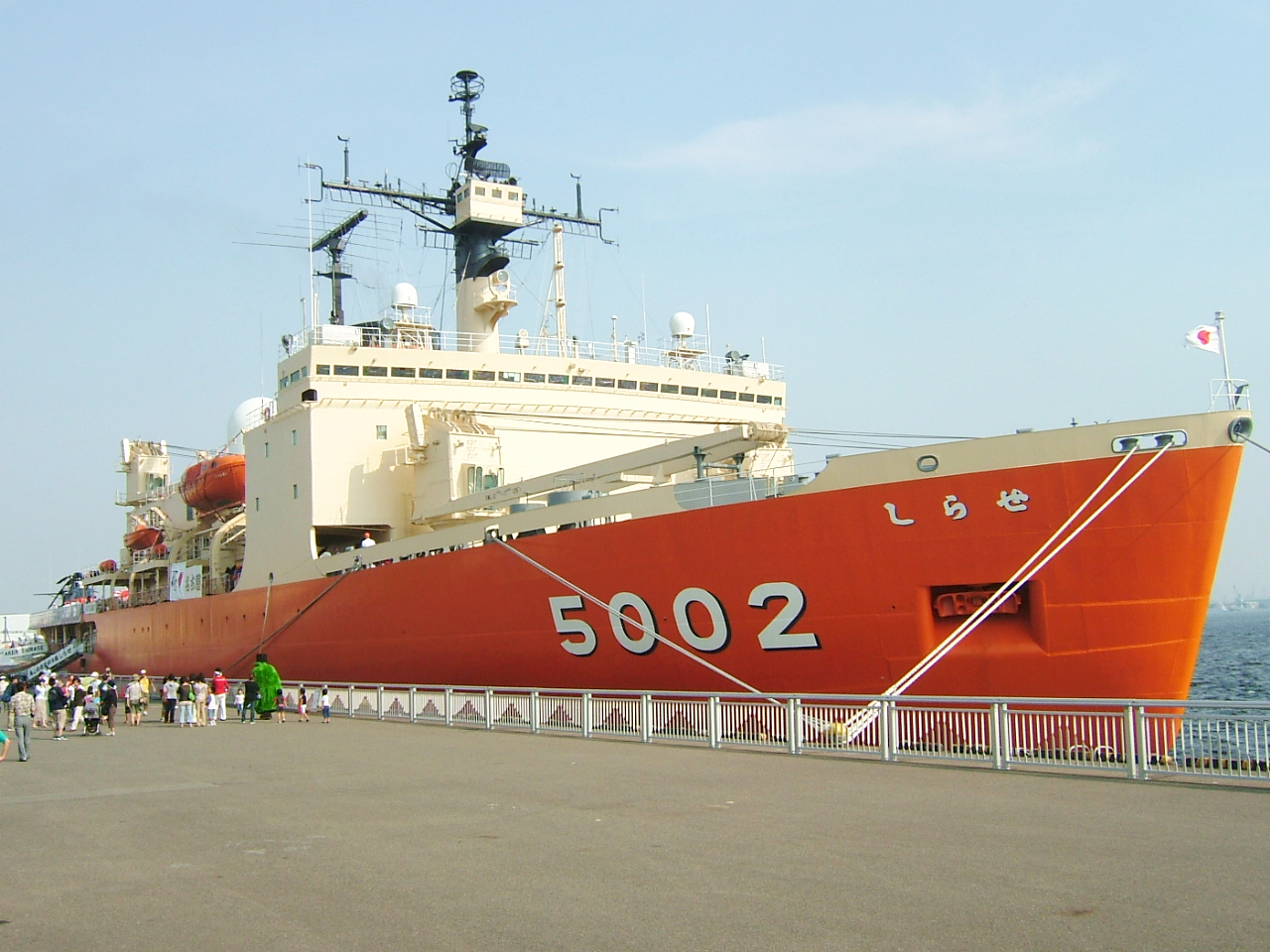
- Shirase

History

Japan
- Name: Shirase; (しらせ)
- Namesake: Shirase Glacier
- Ordered: 1979
- Laid down: 5 March 1981
- Launched: 11 December 1981
- Commissioned: 12 November 1982
- Decommissioned: 30 July 2008
- Home port: Yokosuka
- Status: Under remodeling into observation and exhibition facility

Class overview
- Preceded by: Fuji class
- Succeeded by: Shirase class (2008)

General characteristics
- Type: Icebreaker
- Displacement: 11,600 long tons (11,786 t)
- Length: 134 m (439 ft 8 in)
- Beam: 28 m (91 ft 10 in)
- Draft: 9.8 m (32 ft 2 in)
- Propulsion: Diesel-electric, 30,000 PS
- Speed: 19 knots (22 mph; 35 km/h) (max)
- Complement: Approx. 170 sailors + 60 researchers
- Aircraft carried: 2 helicopters

Shirase (しらせ; Hull number: AGB-5002) was a Japanese icebreaker operated by the Japan Maritime Self-Defense Force (JMSDF) and Japan's third icebreaker for Antarctic expeditions. Her successor (AGB-5003) has the same name. She was decommissioned in July 2008, and is expected to be revived under a new owner as a facility for observation and exhibition regarding weather and environment.

She was launched in December 1981, and was commissioned in November 1982 to succeed to Fuji (AGB-5001). Since November 1983, she served in 25 Antarctic expeditions. She was able to move at 3 knots breaking 1.5 meters of ice.

In 2008, the government began to invite public contribution of plans to utilize this ship after the scheduled retirement. As to the first invitation, however, none of the plans was adopted mainly due to prime cost and problem on securing safety. In October 2008, after the retirement, the government once decided to scrap this ship.

Nevertheless, there were requests of preserving Shirase sent to the authority, even from ordinary people who were not engaged in the Antarctic project. And, the mean price of iron scrap was declining since the summer of 2008. In 2009, the government again accepted public applications from 17 July to 11 September. Four parties submitted plans, and a plan by a weather information company Weathernews Inc. was adopted by 9 November 2009.

On its website, Weathernews says it hopes to rename it as "SHIRASE" (not in hiragana but in Latin alphabet capitals) and to utilize it as a facility for monitoring the polar circles, for observing weather around Tokyo and for exhibitions, discussions and experiences on climate changes and global environment. On 10 February 2010, the ship was handed over to Weathernews.

Weathernews officially took over the vessel on 11 February 2010.

== Naming ==
In Japanese, the name "Shirase" is written in hiragana. This name was adopted from among about 62,000 entries from the public. Officially, this name is said to have been taken from Shirase Glacier. (Due to a JMSDF internal naming rule, an icebreaker was to take a name from a place.) This glacier bears the family name, which is written in kanji, of Lieutenant Nobu Shirase, a Japanese pioneer of Antarctic exploration.
