= Shirase Bank =

- Submerged bank Shirase Bank (Antarctica)
- Interactive map of Shirase Bank
- Ocean: Southern Ocean

Shirase Bank (76°40′S 158°0′W) is a submarine bank located off the Shirase Coast in the Ross Sea. Name approved 6/88 (ACUF 228).
