= Nobu Shirase =

Japanese army officer and explorer

- 白瀬 矗
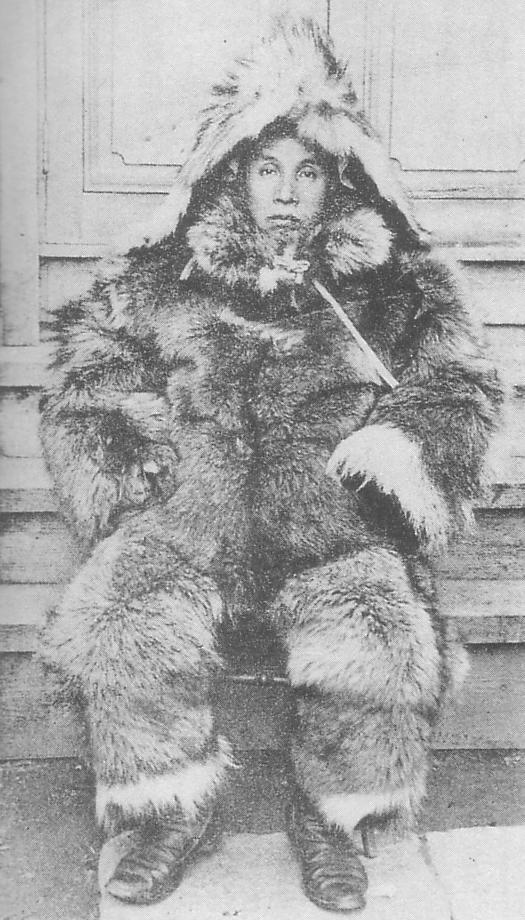
- Born: 13 June 1861; Konoura, Akita Prefecture, Japan
- Died: 4 September 1946 (aged 85); Toyota, Aichi, Japan
- Military career
- Allegiance: Empire of Japan
- Branch: Imperial Japanese Army
- Rank: Lieutenant
- Unit: Transport Corps
- Conflicts: First Sino-Japanese War; Russo-Japanese War
- Other work: Leader of the Japanese Antarctic Expedition

Nobu Shirase (白瀬 矗, Shirase Nobu; 13 June 1861 – 4 September 1946) was a Japanese army officer and explorer. He led the first Japanese Antarctic Expedition, 1910–12, which reached a southern latitude of 80°5′, and made the first landing on the coast of King Edward VII Land.

Shirase had harboured polar ambitions since boyhood. By way of preparation, during his military service he participated in an expedition to the northern Kuril Islands. This venture was poorly organised and ended badly, but nonetheless provided him with useful training for future polar exploration. His longstanding intention was to lead an expedition to the North Pole, but when this mark was claimed by Robert Peary in 1909, Shirase switched his attention to the south.

Unable to attract government support for his Antarctic venture, Shirase raised the finance privately. In its first season, 1910–11, the expedition failed to make a landing, and was forced to winter in Australia. Its second attempt, in 1911–12, was more successful. Although the expedition's achievements were modest, it demonstrated that the Japanese were competent Antarctic travellers, and Shirase returned to Japan in June 1912 to much local acclaim, although the rest of the world showed little interest in his exploits. Even in Japan his fame was short-lived, and Shirase soon found himself faced with a burden of expedition debt that took him most of the rest of his life to redeem. He died in relative poverty in 1946.

Long after Shirase's death, there was belated recognition in Japan of his pioneering endeavours. Several geographical features in Antarctica were named after him or his expedition; the revived Japanese Antarctic Research Expedition named its third and fourth ice-breaking vessels Shirase; his home city of Nikaho erected a statue in 1981, and in 1990 opened a museum dedicated to his memory and the work of his expedition.

== Life ==
=== Early years ===
Nobu Shirase was born on 13 June 1861, in the Jorenji temple at Konoura (now part of the city of Nikaho in the Akita Prefecture), where his father served as a Buddhist priest. At the time of Shirase's birth, Japan was still largely a closed society, isolated from the rest of the world and ruled by the Tokugawa shogunate which forbade citizens to leave Japan on pain of death. Shirase was seven years old when, following the Boshin civil war of 1868–69, the shogunate was replaced by the Meiji dynasty and the slow process of modernisation began.

Although the concept of geographical exploration was alien in Japan, from an early age Shirase developed a passionate and enduring interest in polar exploration, inspired by the stories he received of the European explorers such as Sir John Franklin and the search for the Northwest Passage. After leaving school in 1879 he began preparation for the priesthood, but this conflicted with his deeper desire to become an explorer. So he left the temple and began training for a career in the Imperial army. In 1881 he was commissioned as a lieutenant in the Transport Corps. To prepare himself for future rigours, he adopted a deliberately spartan lifestyle, avoiding drink and tobacco, and forsaking the warmth of the fireside for a regime of hard exercise.

=== Chishima Expedition 1893–95 ===
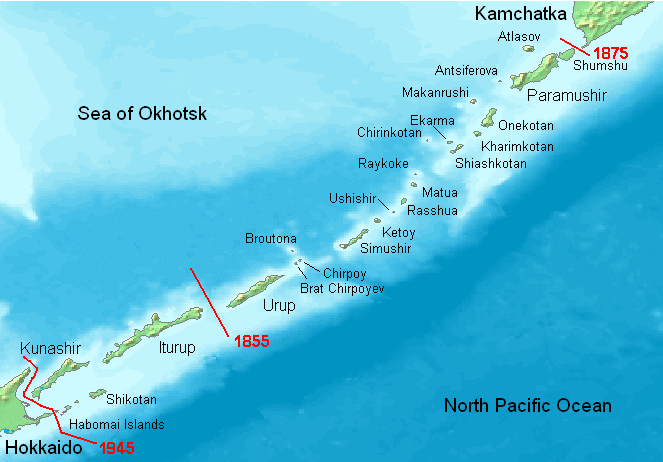
Kuril islands, showing the Russian-Japanese division at various dates

In the course of his military duties, Shirase discussed his ambitions to explore the Arctic with a more senior officer, Kodama Gentarō, who advised him that he should first try exploring the Kuril Islands (known in Japan as the Chishima Islands. These islands form a long archipelago that stretches from Hokkaido in the south to the Russian Kamchatka Peninsula in the north. Ownership of the islands had long been in dispute between Japan and Russia, until the Treaty of St. Petersburg, signed in May 1875, awarded the entire chain to Japan which in return gave up its territorial claims on the island of Sakhalin.

An opportunity arose in 1893, when Shirase was able to join an expedition led by Naritada Gunji to the northern islands in the chain. The aim was to establish a permanent Japanese colony on the northernmost island of Shumshu. The expedition included a diversion to Alaska, on a covert military mission. Poorly organised and ill-equipped, the expedition went badly; during the winter of 1893–94, ten of its members died. Its leader, Gunji, left after a year to fight in the First Sino-Japanese War, leaving Shirase and the survivors to face a second winter, during which several more succumbed to privation and scurvy. They were finally relieved in August 1895. Shirase blamed the disaster on poor organisation and leadership, but nevertheless found the experience of Arctic invaluable for his future plans. For the time being he remained in the army, and fought in the Russo-Japanese War of 1904–05.

=== Japanese Antarctic Expedition 1910–12 ===
Expedition ship Kainan Maru

In 1909, Shirase's long-standing ambitions to lead a North Pole expedition were halted when two Americans, Frederick Cook and Robert Peary, each claimed independently to have reached the Pole. Although Cook's claim was quickly discounted, Peary's was widely accepted at the time. Having thus been forestalled, Shirase switched his attention instead to the South Pole. He would have to move quickly, as other expeditions, notably those of Robert Falcon Scott and Roald Amundsen, were in the field. Neither the Japanese government nor the learned societies would support his plans, but in 1910, with help from the influential Count Okuma, he was able to raise funds for an Antarctic expedition, which sailed from Tokyo in the converted fishing vessel Kainan Maru, on 29 November 1910. The plan was to arrive in Antarctica early in 1911, establish winter quarters, and march to the Pole in the 1911–12 season. But Shirase had departed too late; he did not reach Antarctica until March 1911, when the seas had frozen and he was unable to approach land. He was forced to retreat to Sydney, Australia, and winter there. In Australia the expedition received much help and encouragement from the distinguished geologist and Antarctic explorer, Edgeworth David, to whom, as a token of appreciation, Shirase presented his samurai sword.

In November 1911, his expedition refreshed and replenished, Shirase set out for the Antarctic again. He had by this time modified his plans; he recognised that the conquest of the Pole was beyond his reach – Scott and Amundsen were too far ahead of him – and settled for more modest objectives in the fields of science and general exploration. They arrived at the Great Ice Barrier in the Ross Sea in January 1912, where they collected meteorological data while Shirase led a sledge journey – the "Dash Patrol" – across an uncharted section of the Barrier, reaching a latitude of 80°5'S. Another party landed on King Edward VII Land – the first ever to do so from the sea – and explored there, also collecting geological samples. The expedition arrived back in Japan in June 1912 to general acclaim, with no loss of life, no serious injuries and all in good health. Although it had made no major geographical or scientific discoveries, it had proved Japan's ability to organise and execute a polar expedition, the first such by any non-European country. It provided only the fourth instance of travel beyond the 80°S mark, and had surpassed all previous speed records for sledge journeys. Its landing on the King Edward's Land coast was an achievement that had previously defeated both Scott and Ernest Shackleton, and Kainan Maru had explored the Antarctic coast further east than any ship up to that time.

=== Post-expedition, later life and death ===
Shirase and his companions were treated as heroes on their return, and given a triumphal parade through the streets of Tokyo. Shirase was invited to give a personal account of his experiences to the Imperial family. This, however, proved to be a short-lived period of fame; six weeks after the expedition's return the Emperor Meiji died; the national interest in Antarctica was diverted, and then faded away. Shirase's memoir, published in 1913, has a lukewarm reception, while beyond Japan's boundaries the expedition was either unnoticed or disregarded. Meanwhile, the costs of the expedition had risen considerably as a result of the extra time spent in the south. The government offered no help, and Shirase was faced with responsibility for a large debt.

Shirase sold his house to raise funds. For several years, he toured the country giving lectures. In 1921 he returned to the Kuril Islands, hoping to raise further funds through a commercial venture into fur farming. This was only partially successful, and by 1924 he was back in mainland Japan, eking out a living from the land. His former exploits were not quite forgotten; in 1927 he was invited to meet Amundsen, who was visiting Tokyo to publicise details of his forthcoming planned flight over the North Pole. The two had not previously met; when their two expeditions had briefly coincided in the Bay of Whales, in January 1912, Amundsen had been away on his polar journey.

As a further sign of increasing recognition, in 1933, when the Japanese Polar Research Institute was founded, Shirase became its honorary president. In that same year, the first English language account of the Japanese Antarctic Expedition was published in the Geographical Journal. Two years later, in 1935, Shirase was able to settle the last of his expedition's outstanding debts. Soon afterwards, the country was embroiled in the Second Sino-Japanese War, and all further interest in polar exploration was shelved. Shirase lived through the war years unobtrusively, in a rented room above a fish shop, and died on 4 September 1946 at the age of 85.

== Legacy and memorials ==
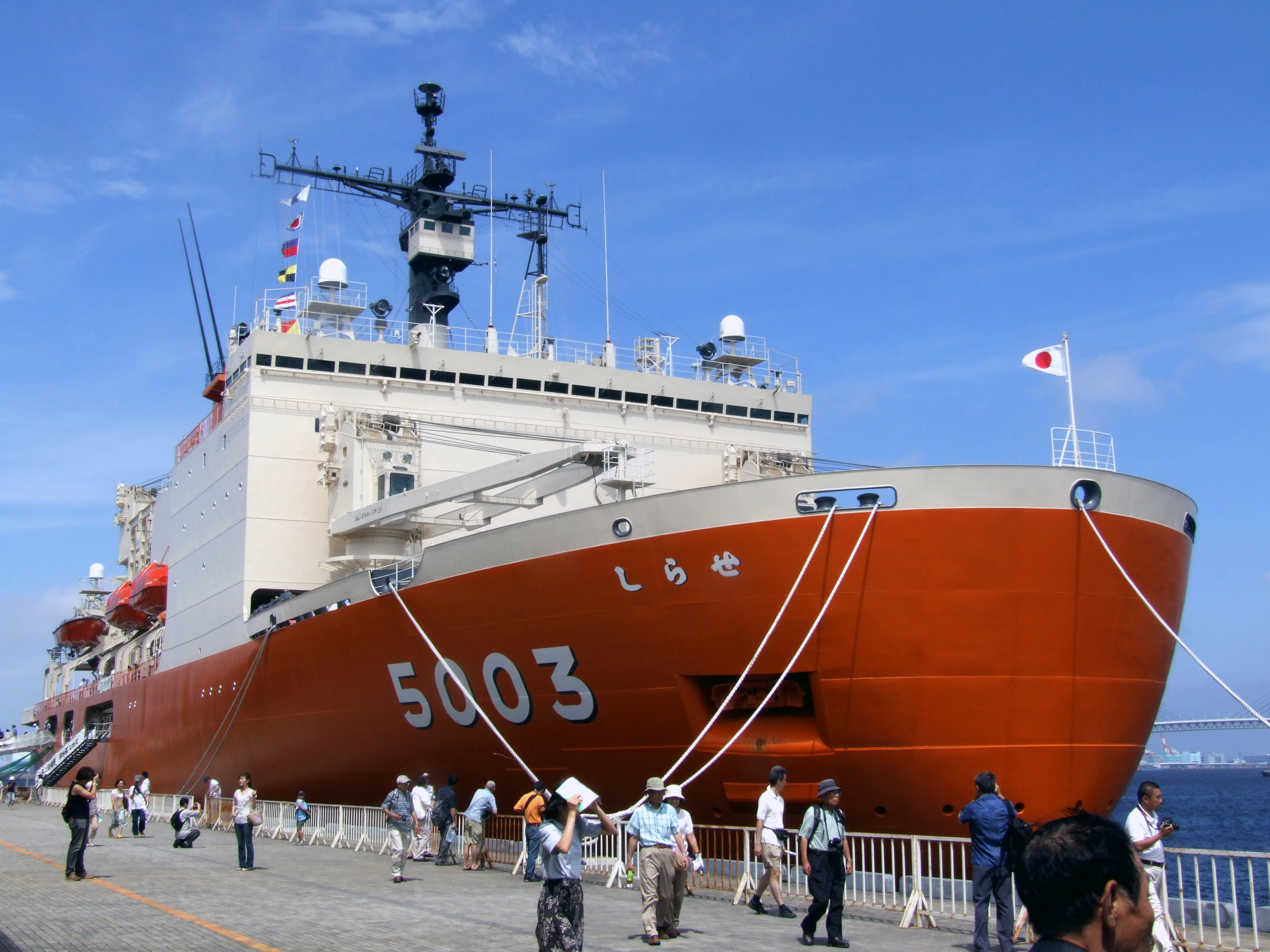
JARE's latest (2009) icebreaker Shirase

Since his death, Shirase's contribution to Antarctic history has been widely recognised, in Japan and elsewhere. Japan's interest in the Antarctic revived in 1956, when the first Japanese Antarctic Research Expedition (JARE) sailed with the research ship Soya to East Ongul Island and established the Showa research station. JARE named numerous features in the area, including the Shirase Glacier. In 1961 the New Zealand Antarctic Place-Names Committee (NZ-APC) gave the name Shirase Coast to a part of the coastline of King Edward VII Land.

In Sydney, Australia, the Australian Museum now holds the samurai sword presented to Edgeworth David by Shirase just before the expedition began its second voyage to Antarctica in November 1911. The sword was given to the museum in 1979 by David's daughter, and has become a particular point of interest to many Japanese visitors.

In 1981, JARE named its new icebreaker vessel Shirase. This remained in service for 28 years; its replacement, from 2009, was also named Shirase. Also in 1981, Shirase's home town of Nikaho erected a statue close to the explorer's birthplace. The Shirase Antarctic Expedition Party Memorial Museum, dedicated to the explorer's memory, opened in Nikaho in 1990. Each year, on 28 January, the museum holds a special festival, the Walk in the Snow, as a tribute to Shirase's unwavering dedication to the cause of Antarctic exploration.

== Notes and references ==
=== Sources ===
- "About JARE (Japanese Antarctic Research Expedition)". National Institute of Polar Research.
- Alberts, Fred G., ed. (1981). Geographic Names of the Antarctic. Washington DC: US National Science Foundation. OCLC 497666264.
- Amundsen, Roald; Nilsen, Thorvald; Prestrud, Kristian (1976) [1912]. The South Pole: An Account of the Norwegian expedition in the Fram, 1910–12 (Volumes I and II). Translated by Chater, A.G. London: C. Hurst & Company. ISBN 0-903983-47-8.
- Barr, Susan (2013). "The Japanese Antarctic Expedition of 1912" (PDF). Nankyoku Shiryō (Antarctic Record). 57 (2). National Institute of Polar Research: 299–307. S2CID 165139563. Archived from the original (PDF) on 2019-10-21.
- Florek, Stan (22 March 2013). "Our Global Neighbours: Nobu Shirase". Australian Museum.
- "Gunji, Shigetada". Portraits of Modern Japanese Historical Figures. National Diet Library, Japan.
- Hamre, Ivar (November 1933). "The Japanese South Polar Expedition of 1911-1912". The Geographical Journal. 82 (5): 411–423. doi:10.2307/1786962. JSTOR 1786962.
- "Japanese Antarctica Expedition and the Shirase Sword". Australian Museum. Archived from the original on 19 October 2019.
- Launius, Roger D.; Fleming, James R.; DeVorkin, David H. (2010). Globalizing Polar Science. New York: Palgrave MacMillan. ISBN 978-0-230-10533-1.
- March, G. Patrick (1996). Eastern Destiny: Russia in Asia and the North Pacific. Westport CT: Praeger Publishers. ISBN 0-275-95566-4.
- Masakane, Inoue (2012). 井上正鉄 『日本南極探検隊長 白瀬矗』 極地研ライブラリー、 (in Japanese). Tokyo: Seizandshoten. ISBN 978-4-425-57031-7. OCLC 820753055.
- "Nobu Shirase". South-pole.com.
- "Nobu Shirase (1861–1946)". Antarctic Logistics. 2010-08-28.
- Pain, Stephanie (24 December 2011). "Scott, Amundsen… and Nobu Shirase". New Scientist (2844).
- "Shirase". Scott Polar Research Institute.
- "Shirase Antarctic Expedition Party Memorial Museum". Akita Prefecture. Archived from the original on October 26, 2019.
- "Shirase Antarctic Expedition Memorial Museum". Honjo Yuri English Guide. 15 November 2016.
- "Shirase, Nobu (1861–1946)". Portraits of National Historicsal Figures. National Diet Library, Japan. 2013.
- Turney, Chris (2012). 1912: The Year the World Discovered Antarctica. London: The Bodley Head. ISBN 978-1-84792-174-1.
- Ivanov, Lyubomir; Ivanova, Nusha (2022). Heroic period. In: The World of Antarctica. Generis Publishing. pp. 84–90. ISBN 979-8-88676-403-1
