= Shirase Coast =

Geographical object in Antarctica

Geography of Shirase Coast
- Continent: Antarctica
- Region: Ross Ice Shelf and Ross Sea
- Coordinates: 78°30′S 156°00′W

Shirase Coast (78°30′S 156°0′W) is the north segment of the relatively ill-defined coast along the east side of Ross Ice Shelf and Ross Sea, lying between the north end of Siple Coast (about 80°10′S 151°00′W) and Cape Colbeck. Named by NZ-APC in 1961 after Lieutenant Nobu Shirase (1861–1946), leader of the Japanese expedition, whose ship Kainan Maru sailed near this coast in January 1912. Landings were made at Kainan Bay and at the Bay of Whales, the origin of a 160-mile journey southeast on Ross Ice Shelf. From 76°56′S 155°55′W (off Edward VII Peninsula), another party landed for a sledge trip to the edge of the Queen Alexandra Range.

== See also ==
- Shirase Bank
