= Shirase Glacier =

Glacier in Antarctica

- Location of Queen Maud Land in Antarctica

- Location within Antarctica
- Location: Queen Maud Land
- Coordinates: 70°55′S 38°45′E
- Thickness: unknown
- Terminus: Lützow-Holm Bay
- Status: unknown

Shirase Glacier (Japanese: 白瀬氷河; Shirase Hyōga) is a large glacier entering Havsbotn, the bay that forms the head of Lutzow-Holm Bay in Antarctica. The area occupied by this feature was first mapped as a bay and named Instefjorden (the innermost fjord) by the Lars Christensen Expedition (LCE) of 1936–37. Surveys by Japanese Antarctic Research Expedition (JARE) of 1957–62, revealed the large glacier in this position which they named after Lt. Nobu Shirase, leader of the Japanese Antarctic Expedition of 1911–12. Its nearby features were also charted and named by JARE unless otherwise noted.

The Instekleppane Hills are a group of low rock hills that protrude above the ice slopes at the east side of Shirase Glacier, just south of the southeastern extremity of Lützow-Holm Bay in Antarctica. The hills were mapped by Norwegian cartographers from air photos taken by LCE personnel and named "instekleppane" ("the innermost lumps") after their appearance.

Azarashi Rock, whose name means "seal rock," is located approximately 1 mile (1.6 km) north of the glacier. Mae-hyōga Rock is an exposed rock on the east side of the glacier. The name "Mae-hyoga-iwa" ("outer glacier rock") was given in association with nearby Oku-hyōga Rock ("inner glacier rock"). Oku-hyōga Rock sits 3 nautical miles (6 km) southeast of Mae-hyoga, and is the southernmost bare rock exposed along the east side of the glacier.

== See also ==
- List of glaciers in the Antarctic
- List of Antarctic ice streams
