= USS Curtiss (AV-4) =

Tender of the United States Navy

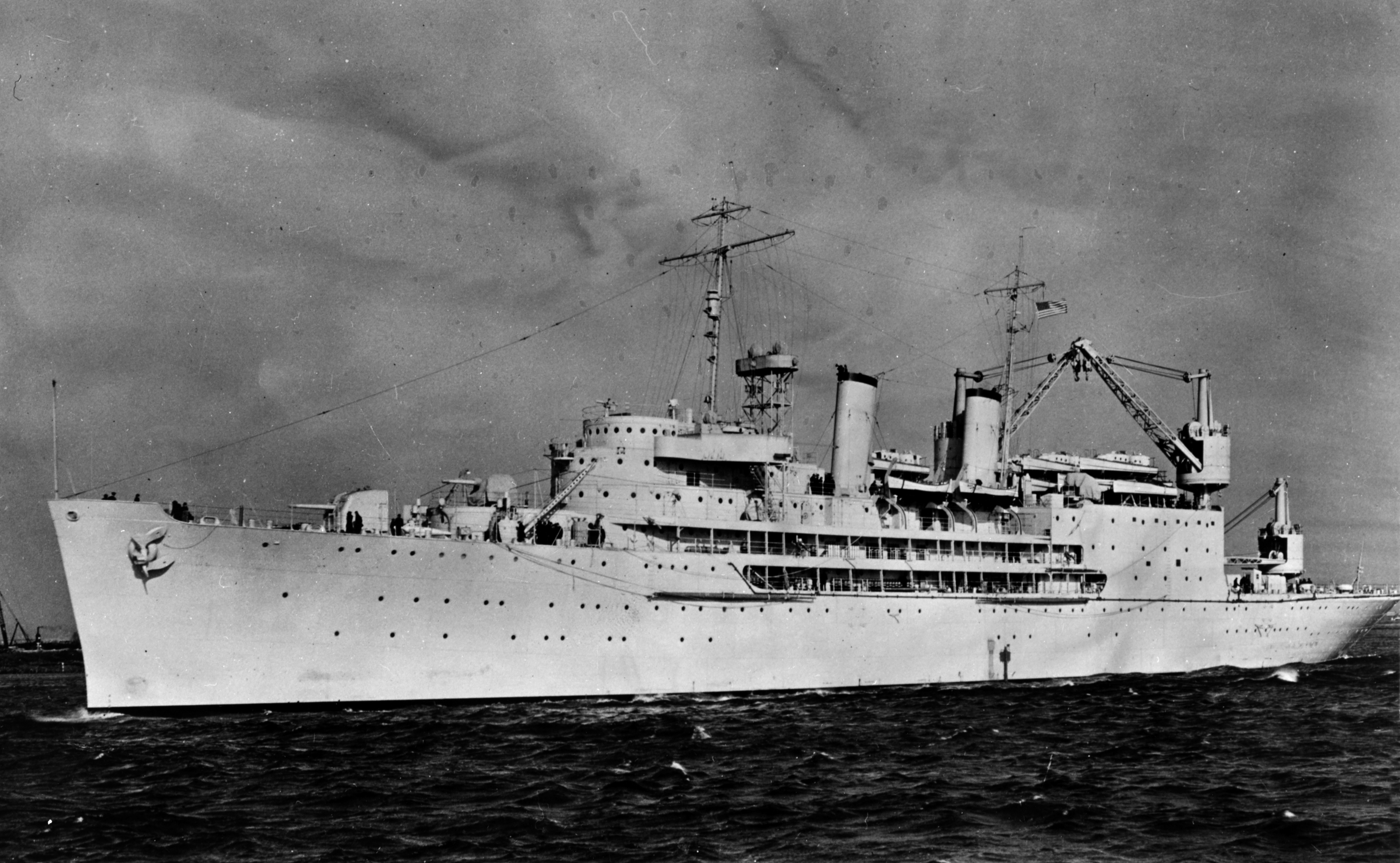
- USS Curtiss when first completed in 1940.

History

United States
- Name: Curtiss
- Namesake: Glenn Curtiss
- Builder: New York Shipbuilding Corporation, Camden, New Jersey
- Laid down: 25 March 1938
- Launched: 20 April 1940
- Commissioned: 15 November 1940
- Decommissioned: 24 September 1957
- Stricken: 1 July 1963
- Identification: Hull symbol: AV-4; Code letters: NEFZ
- Honors and awards: 7 battle stars (World War II)
- Fate: Sold for scrapping, February 1972

General characteristics
- Class & type: Curtiss-class seaplane tender
- Displacement: 8,671 long tons (8,810 t) (light); 13,475 long tons (13,691 t) (full load)
- Length: 527 ft 4 in (160.73 m)
- Beam: 69 ft 3 in (21.1 m)
- Draft: 21 ft 11 in (6.68 m)
- Installed power: 4 × Babcock & Wilcox Express boilers 400 psi (2,800 kPa) 690 °F (366 °C); 12,000 shp (8,900 kW)
- Propulsion: 2 × Geared turbines; 2 × Shafts
- Speed: 19.7 kn (36.5 km/h; 22.7 mph)
- Range: 12,000 nmi (22,000 km; 14,000 mi) at 12 kn (22 km/h; 14 mph)
- Complement: 1,195 officers and men
- Sensors & processing systems: CXAM-1 RADAR from 1940
- Armament: As built: 4 × 5 in (127 mm)/38 caliber guns; 3 × quad 40 mm (1.57 in) Bofors guns; 2 × twin 40 mm Bofors guns; Added during WWII: 2 × twin 40 mm Bofors guns; 12 × single 20 mm (0.79 in) Oerlikon cannons
- Aviation facilities: Helipad (fitted 1954)

USS Curtiss (AV-4) was the first purpose-built seaplane tender constructed for the United States Navy. She was named for Glenn Curtiss, an American aviation pioneer that designed the Curtiss NC-4, the first aircraft to fly across the Atlantic Ocean.

== Construction ==
Curtiss was laid down on 25 March 1938, by the New York Shipbuilding Corporation of Camden, New Jersey. The ship was launched on 20 April 1940, sponsored by Mrs. H. S. Wheeler, and commissioned on 15 November 1940.

== Design ==
The Curtiss class were the first seaplane tenders built from the keel up for the US Navy, the previous tenders had been converted from cargo ships. They were designed to provide command facilities for forward-operating long-range patrol seaplane squadrons. To accomplish this, they were heavily armed with four 5-inch (130 mm)/38 caliber dual-purpose guns and contained repair and maintenance facilities, along with supplies for operating in forward areas for many months.

The ships had a large seaplane deck located at the stern with the maintenance shops located in the superstructure just forward of it. They were built with three large cranes, one located at the starboard extreme of the stern, the second was at the aft of the superstructure on the port side, with the remaining crane located midship on the starboard side. The starboard crane at midship was removed from both ships during WWII and replaced with a 20-millimeter (0.79 in) Oerlikon cannon gun tub. Two of the 5-inch guns were staggered on opposite sides of the rear superstructure, with the remaining two in a superfiring configuration at the bow of the ships.

Designed to displace 8,671 long tons (8,810 t), they were 527 ft (161 m) in length, with a beam of 69 ft (21 m), and a draft of 22 ft (6.7 m). They produced 12,000 shp (8,900 kW) from four Babcock & Wilcox boilers turning a pair of geared turbines and shafts, and were capable of a speed of 20 kn (37 km/h; 23 mph).

Along with their 5-inch guns, they were armed with three quad 40-millimeter (1.57 in) Bofors anti-aircraft (AA) guns and two twin 40-mm AA guns. During WWII both forward 5-in. guns in Albemarle were enclosed, while only the front forward 5-in. gun in Curtiss was enclosed. Two dual 40-mm and twelve 20-mm AA guns were also added.

== Service history ==
=== World War II ===
Curtiss operated out of Norfolk, Virginia, and in the Caribbean for training and in fleet exercises through the spring of 1941. She was one of 14 ships to receive the early RCA CXAM-1 radar. On 26 May, she got underway for Pearl Harbor, from which she served as local guard ship, as well as tending two patrol bomber squadrons. From 15 October-9 November, she sailed to Wake Island, carrying air-crew and cargo to reinforce the garrison.

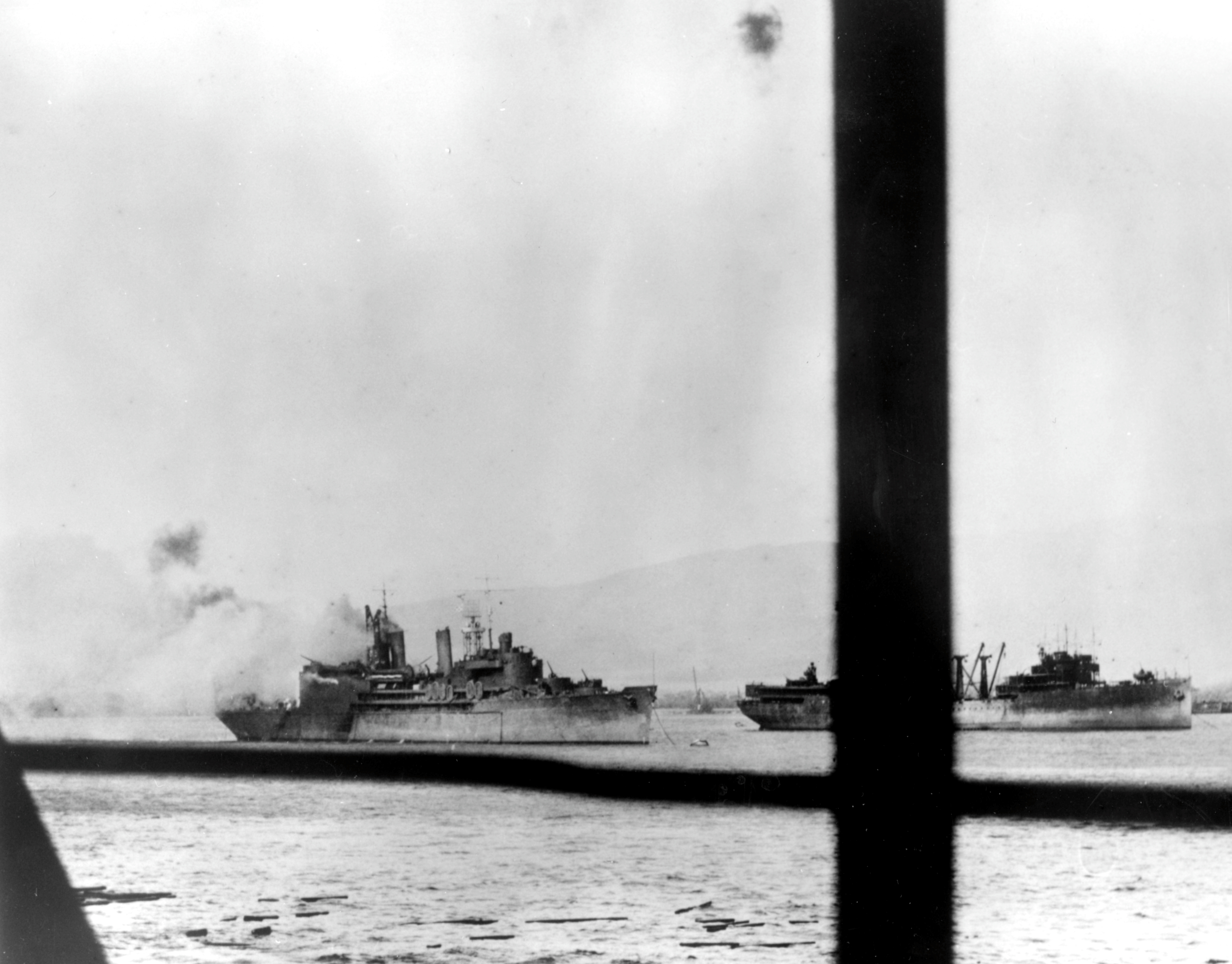
Curtiss burning at Pearl Harbor, 7 December 1941.

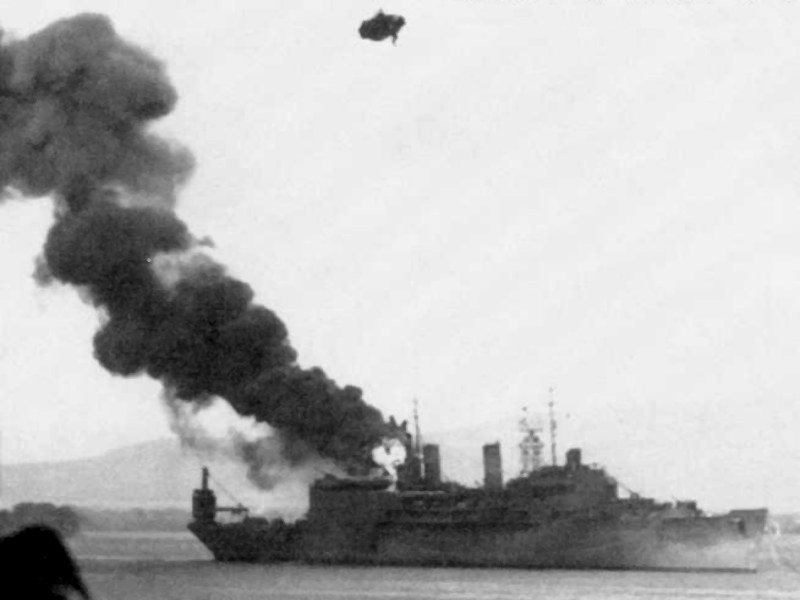
Curtiss burning at Pearl Harbor, 7 December 1941.

==== Pearl Harbor ====
When the Japanese attacked Pearl Harbor, Curtiss was able to get underway and returned fire at the attacking Japanese aircraft. At 08:36, the ship sighted the periscope of a Japanese midget submarine and opened fire. A torpedo from this submarine missed Curtiss, running over and into a dock at Pearl City. Four minutes later, the same submarine surfaced and was further damaged by gunfire before diving again, after which the destroyer Monaghan sank the submarine with a ram and depth charge attack.

At 09:05, Curtiss in combination with the light cruiser Detroit hit a Japanese plane, which then crashed into her No. 1 crane, causing casualties and starting a fire. Three minutes later, she was attacked by an Aichi D3A dive bomber. The bomb from this plane struck Curtiss in the vicinity of her damaged crane and exploded below decks, setting the hangar, main decks and No. 4 handling room on fire. The damaged aircraft crashed off her port beam. With 19 dead and many wounded, Curtiss' crew managed to extinguish the fire and commence emergency repairs.

On 28 December, she was underway for San Diego, California, for more permanent repairs and replacement of the damaged crane with a 20 mm (0.79 in) Oerlikon anti-aircraft cannon. Her repairs were completed in just four days and she was back in Pearl Harbor on 13 January 1942, to begin ferrying men and supplies to bases at Samoa, Suva, and Nouméa, until June.

=== Noumea and the Solomons ===
Departing Pearl Harbor on 2 June 1942, Curtiss served as flagship for Commander, Naval Air, South Pacific, at Naval Base Noumea, from 16 June to 4 August, then served as seaplane tender, flagship, and repair and supply ship for destroyers and small craft engaged in the Solomon operations from Espiritu Santo until 9 July 1943. After overhaul at San Francisco, she arrived at Funafuti, Ellice Islands, 7 November to serve as flagship for Commander Air, Central Pacific, based at Funafuti, until 29 December 1943. She then served at Tarawa, from 31 December 1943 to 8 March 1944; Kwajalein, 10 March to 26 June; Eniwetok, 27 June to 9 August; Saipan, 12 August 1944 to 1 January 1945; and finally Guam, 2 January to 7 February.

=== Okinawa ===
After repairs in San Francisco, Curtiss sailed to Okinawa, arriving on 22 May 1945, to serve as flagship for Commander, Fleet Air Wing 1. On 21 June, a kamikaze and its bomb ripped two holes in her hull and detonated on the third deck, killing 35 and wounding 21 of her crew. Damage control kept her afloat, and four days later she was underway for an overhaul at Mare Island Navy Yard.

=== Post-war ===
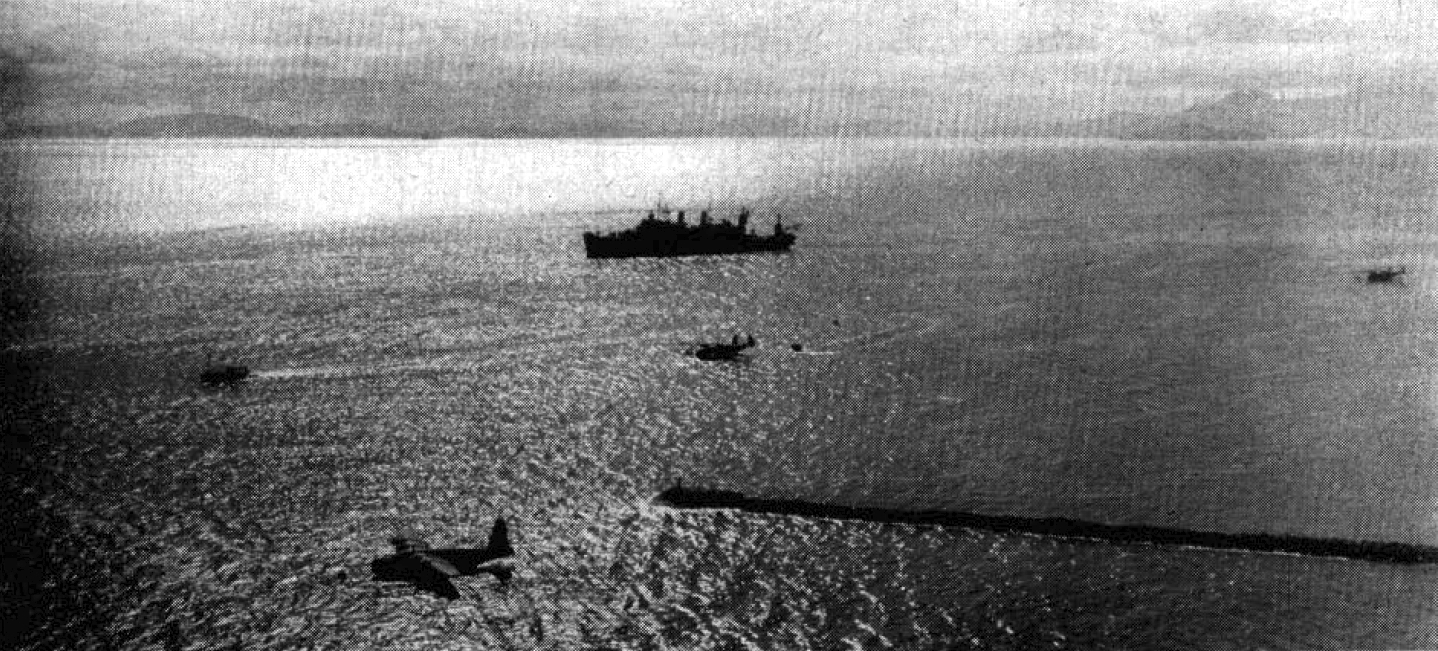
Curtiss with PBMs and a British Sunderland during the Korean War, in 1950.

Rejoining the Fleet in the Western Pacific, Curtiss embarked Commander, Fleet Air Wing 1, who was also Commander Task Force 75, at Okinawa, on 5 December 1945. From May 1946 to June 1947, Curtiss was commanded by Captain Winfield Scott Cunningham, who was in command at Wake Island during the defence in December 1941. Curtiss joined in fleet exercises, operated with patrol squadrons in the Formosa Strait, ferried men and supplies to outlying bases and made several visits to Tsingtao, China, until 8 March 1947, when she sailed for the west coast for overhaul and alterations recommended by the Atomic Energy Commission for the storage of scientific equipment.

In 1948, Curtiss arrived at Eniwetok, with several atomic weapons on board for the exercise "Operation Sandstone". Afterwards she returned to the West Coast before being engaged in exercises in Alaskan waters, returning to San Francisco in early 1949.

Curtiss operated off the California coast on a number of fleet and training exercises until early in 1949, when she served as flagship for Commander 1st Fleet for three weeks of amphibious operations in Alaskan waters to evaluate cold weather equipment. She continued to serve as a flagship for this command during amphibious exercises off Seattle, Washington, during the summer of 1949. Shortly after the outbreak of the Korean War, Curtiss sailed from San Diego to join the 7th Fleet in July 1950, on patrol in the Korea Strait. Sailing out of Iwakuni and Kure, she tended two Martin PBM Mariner squadrons and a squadron of British Short Sunderlands operating over Korean territory. She returned to San Francisco on 14 January 1951 for further alterations to fit her as a base for scientific work.

From 23 February to 13 June 1951, Curtiss served as the flagship for "Operation Greenhouse" and was the base for civilian and military technicians during the atomic tests at Eniwetok. She also provided meteorological information and operated a boat pool. Curtiss served at San Diego in local operations until 29 September 1952, when she again sailed to Eniwetok as flagship during the atomic tests of "Operation Ivy", during which the first hydrogen bomb was detonated. Returning to San Diego, on 4 December, she cruised the west coast and visited Acapulco, Mexico, in 1953. From 10 January to 28 May 1954, she participated in "Operation Castle".

Fitted with a helicopter deck in November–December 1954, Curtiss engaged in a large-scale amphibious exercise on the coast of California in March 1955. From 21 March to 8 August 1956, she took part in "Operation Redwing", the atomic tests at Eniwetok, during which she was visited by the Assistant Secretary of the Navy. As flagship for the First Fleet, she was visited by Vice Admiral A. H. Vedel, Commander-in-Chief of the Royal Danish Navy on 20 September 1956.

Curtiss departed San Diego on 27 December 1956 for "Operation Deep Freeze II", carrying sailors of the wintering-over party, and scientists to take part in the International Geophysical Year program. Calling at Port Lyttelton, New Zealand, from 12 to 15 January 1957, she entered McMurdo Sound on 19 January and transferred cargo by helicopter to the icebreaker Glacier. From 21 to 28 January, she put men and cargo ashore in the same manner as she lay moored to the ice shelf, continuing these operations at Little America from 30 January to 6 February. She carried out ice reconnaissance to Okuma Bay and Sulzberger Bay, then departed McMurdo Sound on 10 February. She called at Port Lyttelton, Auckland, New Zealand, and Sydney, Australia, before returning to San Diego, on 25 March, to undergo repairs for ice damage. She continued her local operations until placed out of commission in reserve on 24 September 1957.

Curtiss was struck from the Naval Vessel Register on 1 July 1963, and was sold for scrapping in February 1972.

== Awards ==
- American Defense Service Medal with "FLEET" clasp
- Asiatic-Pacific Campaign Medal with seven battle stars
- World War II Victory Medal
- Navy Occupation Medal with "ASIA" clasp
- China Service Medal
- National Defense Service Medal
- Korean Service Medal
- Antarctic Service Medal
- United Nations Korea Medal

== Bibliography ==
- Ford, Roger; Gibbons, Tony; Hewson, Rob; Jackson, Bob; Ross, David (2001). The Encyclopedia of Ships. London: Amber Books, Ltd. p. 370. ISBN 978-1-905704-43-9.
- Macintyre, Donald (September 1967). "Shipborne Radar". United States Naval Institute Proceedings.
- Toppan, Andrew (13 December 1998). "Curtiss class heavy seaplane tenders". Archived from the original on 14 May 2021.
- "USS Curtiss (AV-4), Bomb Damage - Pearl Harbor, December 7, 1941". dcfp.navy.mil. Archived from the original on 22 March 2008.
- "Pearl Harbor Attack: USS Curtiss (AV-4) Action Report". history.navy.mil. Archived from the original on 8 June 2015.
- "USS Curtiss (AV-4)". NavSource. 2 October 2020.
- "Curtiss (AV-4)". Dictionary of American Naval Fighting Ships. Navy Department, Naval History and Heritage Command. 6 July 2015. This article incorporates text from this source, which is in the public domain.
