= Kainan Bay =

Iceport in Antarctica

Coordinates: 78°10′S 162°30′W

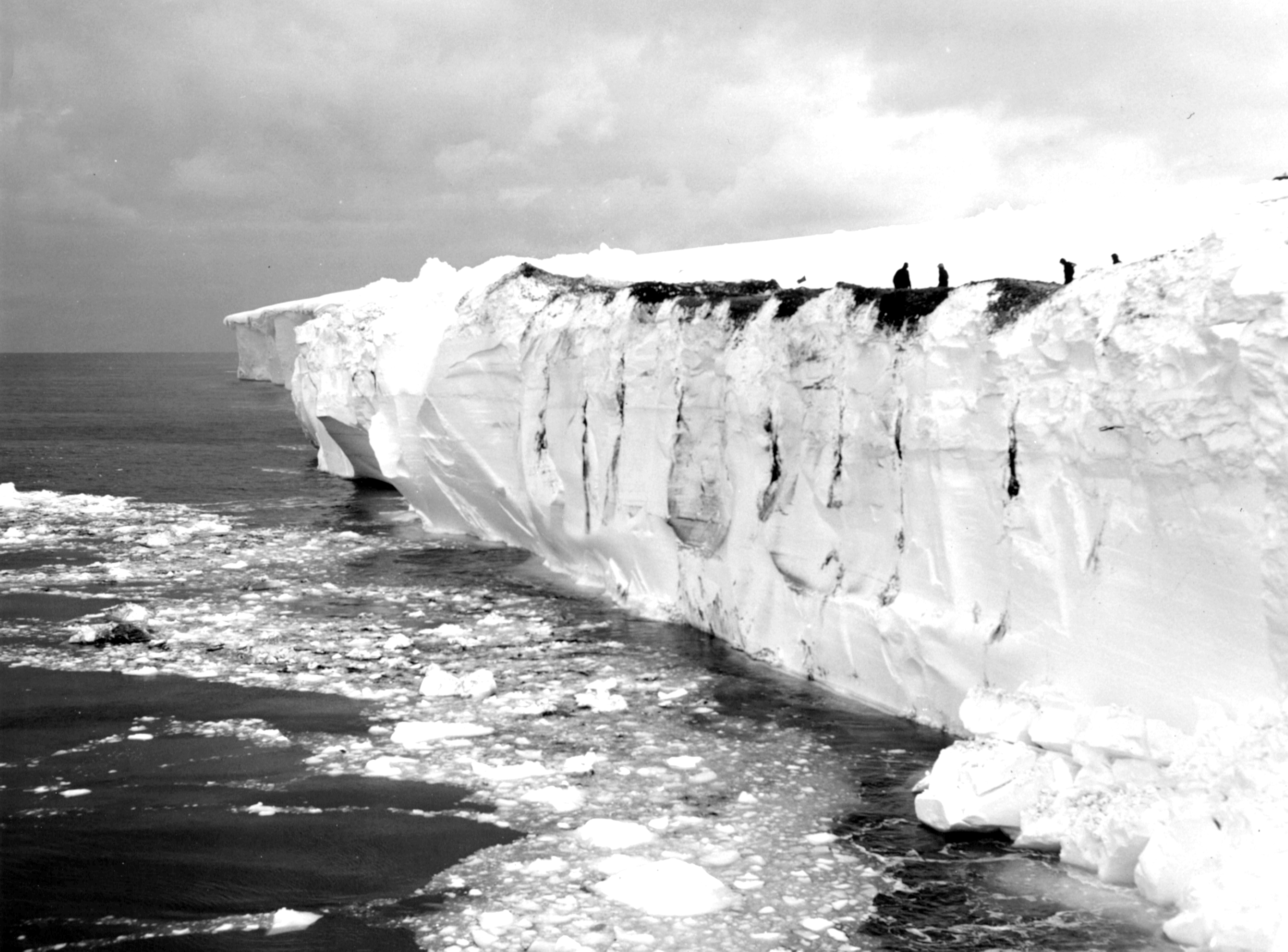
Ice barrier at Kainan Bay, with U.S. Navy Seabees visible near the edge of the full-size image

Kainan Bay (Antarctica)

Kainan Bay is an iceport which indents the front of the Ross Ice Shelf about 37 nautical miles (70 km) northeast of the northwestern end of Roosevelt Island, Antarctica. It was discovered in January 1902 by the British National Antarctic Expedition under Robert Falcon Scott. It was named by the Japanese Antarctic Expedition under Lieutenant Shirase Nobu which, in January 1912, effected a landing on the ice shelf here from the ship Kainan Maru. Little America V, the main scientific base of the U.S. Antarctic program during the International Geophysical Year, 1957–58, was established at this site in late December 1955.
