= Kainan Maru =

- Kainan Maru: Japanese Antarctic Expedition ship

History

Japan
- Owner: Unknown, then Ōkuma Shigenobu, then unknown
- Launched: 1909
- Fate: Unknown

General characteristics
- Type: Barquentine
- Tonnage: 204 GRT
- Length: 30.48 m (100.0 ft)
- Beam: 7.85 m (25.8 ft)
- Propulsion: 18 hp (13 kW) Coal fired

Kainan Maru (開南丸) was a converted fishing boat that was used as the expedition vessel during the Japanese Antarctic Expedition of 1910 to 1912. Substantially smaller than other expedition ships of the era, and with seriously underpowered auxiliary engines, she nevertheless completed a journey of some 50,000 km (31,000 miles). After a false start in the southern summer of 1910–11, she entered the Ross Sea in January 1912 and landed a party on the Great Ice Barrier. While this party engaged in a southern march, Kainan Maru went to King Edward VII Land, where another party carried out survey and scientific work. The expedition returned to Japan with great acclaim in June 1912. However, it was quickly forgotten; Kainan Maru reverted to work as a fishing boat, and its subsequent career and fate remain unknown.

== Construction ==
The ship Kainan Maru, originally named Dainai Hokomaru (in some sources Hoko Maru), was built around 1909, designed as a fishing vessel for use in northern waters. Her double-layered hull was constructed with ice navigation in mind, with a keel of zelkova (hard Japanese elm) and pine, stanchions of pine, frames of zelkowa and cypress. The hull was sheathed with iron, with additional protection at the stem. She was rigged as a barquentine, measuring 30.48 m (100 ft) length and 7.85m (25¾ ft) beam, with a keel-to-deck depth of 3.96 m (13 ft). Gross register tonnage was 204.

== Japanese Antarctic Expedition 1910–12 ==
=== Organisation and preparation ===
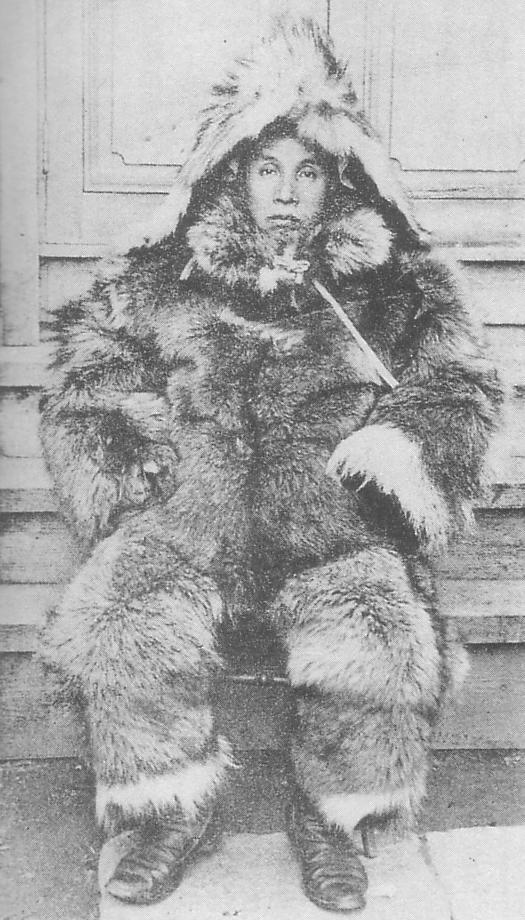
Nobu Shirase, leader of the Japanese Antarctic Expedition

In September 1910 the ship was acquired with funds provided by Ōkuma Shigenobu, the former Japanese prime minister, who registered the vessel in his own name, to act as the expedition vessel for the proposed Japanese Antarctic Expedition. Renamed Kainan Maru ("Southern Pioneer") at the suggestion of the naval hero Admiral Togo, the ship was overhauled in preparation for the expedition. Further iron protection plating was added, and she was given an 18-horsepower auxiliary engine. The interior was re-organised to provide a coal capacity of 55 tons.

The expedition was the brainchild of an army reserve officer, Lieutenant Nobu Shirase, who believed that Japan should take its place alongside the Western powers in the exploration of Antarctica. Shirase's aim was a Japanese conquest of the South Pole; he was aware that a major expedition from Britain, Scott's Terra Nova Expedition was already in the field with the same objective – it would soon be joined by the Norwegian expedition under Roald Amundsen – so the Japanese venture would need to leave as early as possible to avoid being forestalled. However, Government support and that of the learned societies proved hard to come by. A start date for the expedition was fixed for late November, but realistically this was too late in the season for a successful Antarctic journey.

Kainan Maru was by far the smallest of expedition vessels that had sailed to Antarctica at that time, at about half the size of Amundsen's Fram and one-third the size of Scott's Terra Nova. Its 18 hp motor was seriously underpowered for work in the ice; by way of comparison, the auxiliary engines of Fram and Terra Nova were 180 and 140 horsepower respectively.

=== First season ===
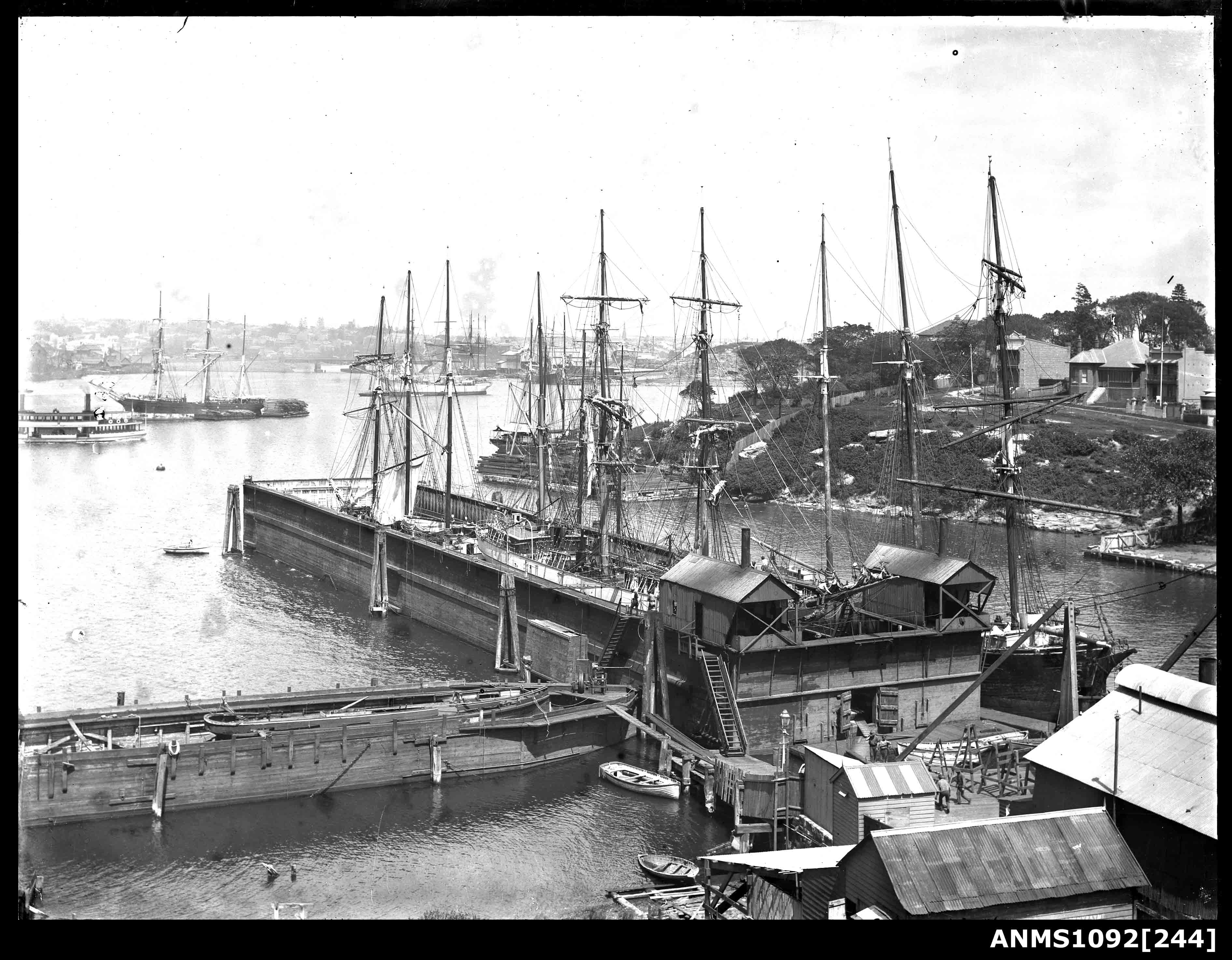
Jubilee Dock, Sydney Harbour (1905)

Kainan Maru finally left Tokyo on 29 November 1910, under its captain, Naokichi Namora, an experienced sailor. The plan was to reach Antarctica, land, establish a winter station and then, late in 1911, to make a dash for the South Pole. However, the late start meant that Kainan Maru did not reach Wellington, New Zealand, until 7 February 1911. On 11 February, Kainan Maru left Wellington, soon encountering poor weather and much ice; as the ship moved further south, the lateness of the season became apparent. By 12 March, at a latitude of 74°16′S and in sight of the Antarctic coast, the sea was beginning to freeze; Kainan Maru was in danger of becoming trapped and beset. Captain Nomura's skill avoided this fate, but a landing was impossible. The ship turned north, and retreated to Sydney Harbour in Australia, arriving on 1 May to spend the winter there.

In Sydney, the expedition was received initially with a mixture of scorn and suspicion. It required the intervention of Edgeworth David, the distinguished geologist who had accompanied Shackleton's Nimrod Expedition in 1907–09, to convince the public that this was a serious expedition. The Japanese party was allowed to set up a temporary camp at Parsley Bay, overlooking the harbour, while Nomura returned to Japan to arrange finance for a second Antarctic voyage in the following summer. With this funding, the expedition was reprovisioned; Kainan Maru was overhauled in Sydney's Jubilee Dock, where it was re-rigged as a two-masted schooner. Shirase now recognised the impracticality of aiming for the South Pole, and shifted the expedition's aims to those of science and surveying. Kainan Maru left Sydney on 19 November, carrying two years' provisions.

=== Second season ===
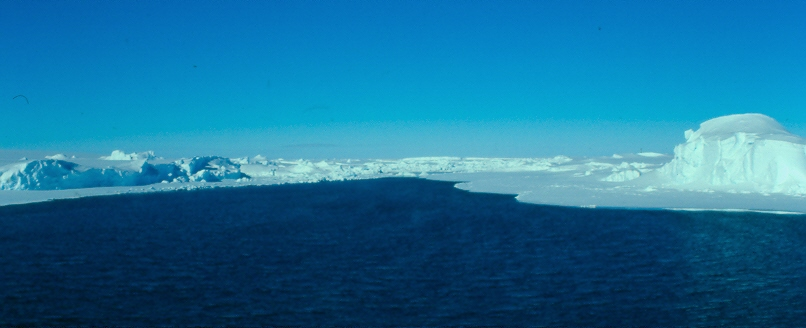
Bay of Whales, photographed in 2007

The second voyage south proceeded relatively smoothly, without serious incident. On 10 January the Great Ice Barrier came into view. In the course of exploring the Barrier edge, Kainan Maru encountered Amundsen's ship Fram, lying in the Bay of Whales while awaiting the Norwegian's return from his polar march. A few kilometres beyond this point, Kainan Maru found a suitable anchorage. The Japanese party now divided. One group, led by Shirase, formed the "Dash Patrol" and embarked on a southward sledge journey, not with the Pole in mind, but to penetrate as far south as possible. Meanwhile, Kainan Maru, with the rest of the expedition, sailed further east to investigate King Edward VII Land. The Dash Patrol set out on 20 January; on 28 January, with supplies running low, they reached 80°5′S before turning back. Three days later they regained the Barrier edge, achieving on this return journey a sledging speed record.

Kainan Maru arrived at King Edward VII Land on 23 January, reaching a longitude of 155°W, further east than any expedition up to that time. They also fixed the eastern boundary of the Great Ice Barrier, at a point which they named Okuma Bay. After a few days' survey and exploration ashore, the land party was picked up by the ship, which returned to the Bay of Whales to retrieve Shirase's patrol. By 31 January all were aboard; the homeward journey began on 4 February. They reached Wellington on 23 March, and arrived in Tokyo harbour on 19 June to a great reception. Kainan Maru had travelled a total distance of 50,000 km (31,000 miles). Members of Amundsen's expedition, who saw her in the Antarctic, said that they would not have travelled half that distance in her.

== Later career ==
On its return to Japan the expedition was lauded for its achievements, but was quickly forgotten. Kainan Maru was resold to her former owners, and resumed work in the northern seas as a fishing boat. Details of her subsequent career and ultimate fate remain unknown. In February 1944 a Japanese fishing boat named Kainan Maru was sunk in the Gulf of Tonkin in a USAAF attack, but it is not recorded whether this was the former expedition ship.

== See also ==
- Heroic Age of Antarctic Exploration
- List of Antarctic exploration ships from the Heroic Age, 1897–1922
