= Japanese Antarctic Expedition =

Research expedition

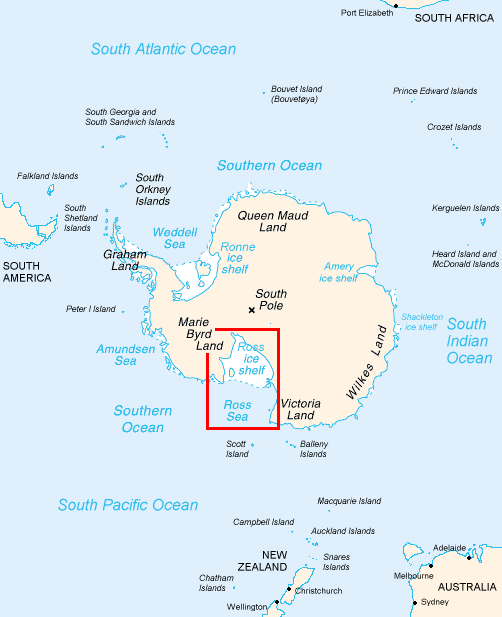
Map of Antarctica, showing (red rectangle) the area of the expedition's operations. Wellington (New Zealand) and Sydney (Australia) appear on the bottom edge of the map.

The Japanese Antarctic Expedition of 1910–12, in the ship Kainan Maru, was the first such expedition by a non-European nation. It was concurrent with two major Antarctic endeavours led respectively by Roald Amundsen and Robert Falcon Scott, and has been relatively overlooked in polar history. After failing to land in its first season, the Japanese expedition's original aim of reaching the South Pole was replaced by less ambitious objectives, and after a more successful second season it returned safely to Japan, without injury or loss of life.

The brainchild of an army reserve lieutenant, Nobu Shirase, the expedition was privately funded. It left Japan in November 1910, and after its first season's failure was forced to spend the winter of 1911 in Australia. In its second Antarctic season, 1911–12, it made no major scientific or geographical discoveries, but could claim some significant achievements. These included the first landing on the coast of King Edward VII Land, the fastest recorded sledging journey, and the most easterly point along the Antarctic coast, to that date, reached by a ship. It also became only the fourth team to travel beyond the 80°S mark.

On their return, Shirase and his team were greeted as heroes, but interest swiftly died, and Shirase was burdened with expedition debts that took years to clear. Outside Japan, the expedition was generally dismissed, or ignored altogether. Only many years after Shirase's death in obscurity, in 1946, did the Japanese begin to honour him and his achievements. The availability since 2011 of an English translation of Shirase's account has revealed the story of the expedition to a wider audience. The first Japanese expedition is further commemorated in the names of several geographical features in Antarctica.

== Planning ==
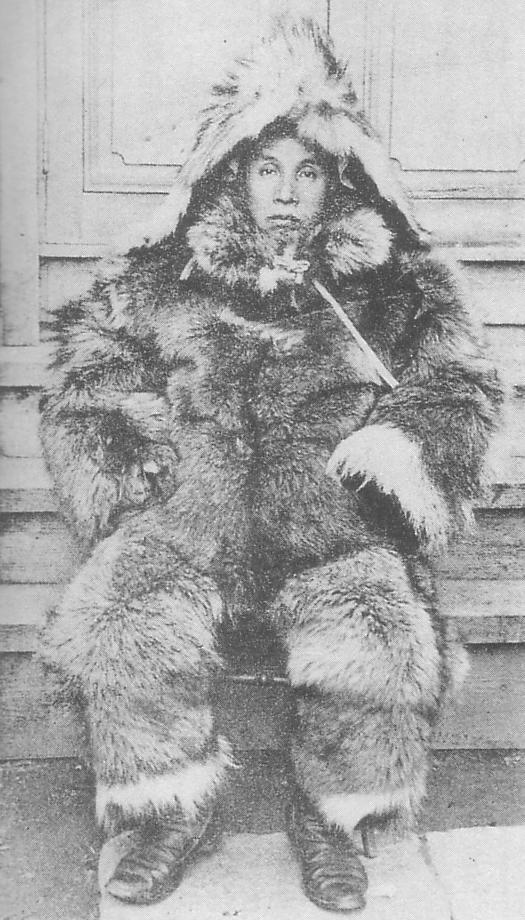
Nobu Shirase, dressed for the Antarctic

=== Background ===
Japan's slow emergence from isolation, following the fall of the Tokugawa shogunate in 1868, kept it largely aloof from the growing international interest in polar exploration that escalated in the late 19th and early 20th centuries. However, the idea intrigued and became a private passion for an army officer, Lieutenant Nobu Shirase, who, inspired by the tales that reached him of European explorers such as Franklin, nursed a desire to emulate his heroes and explore the Arctic. In 1893, by way of preparation, Shirase joined an exploration party to the Chishima Islands, led by Meiji Gohji. This expedition turned into a disaster, from which Shirase emerged in 1895 as one of few survivors, most of the party having succumbed to privation or scurvy. The harshness of these experiences did not diminish his Arctic ambitions. He dreamt of conquering the North Pole until, in 1909, he learned that two American rivals, Frederick Cook and Robert Peary, were each claiming, separately, to have reached the Pole. Undaunted, Shirase then changed his plans; he would go south instead, and aim for the still unconquered South Pole.

=== Preparations ===
Shirase knew that other nations were developing similar plans, and that if he were to have any hope of success he would have to move quickly. Early in 1910 he presented an outline of his plans to the government, declaring that, within three years, he would raise the Japanese flag at the South Pole. He added that his expedition would also advance the cause of science: "The powers of the world ridicule the Empire of Japan, saying we Japanese are barbarians who are strong and brave in warfare, but cowardly when it comes to the realm of science. For the sake of bushido (honour) we must correct this regrettable situation".

The government's response was lukewarm; it agreed a financial contribution and the possible loan of a ship, but in the event, parliament would not release the funds. The learned societies were uninterested; in their view, Shirase was neither a scholar nor a scientist, and his plans, despite his statements to the contrary, were focused more on adventure than on science. Even the Tokyo Geographical Society refused its backing. Amid public indifference and press derision, Shirase's fortunes turned when he secured the support of Count Okuma, the former prime minister, a figure of great prestige and influence. Okuma formed and presided over the Antarctic Expedition Supporters Association, and the public began to contribute, mainly in small amounts from what Shirase described as the "student class". Shirase also obtained important backing from one of Japan's leading newspapers, the Asahi Shimbun. Still the scientific community remained aloof, and the journal of the Tokyo Geographical Society, while reporting on other countries' expeditions, ignored the Japanese venture entirely.

Expedition ship Kainan Maru

Hundreds applied to join the expedition, though none with any polar experience and only one, Terutaro Takeda, with any pretensions to a scientific background – he was an ex-schoolteacher who had also served as a professor's assistant. In the absence of a proper scientific team, Shirase had to scale down his scientific programme; he would concentrate on the conquest of the Pole.

Among the personnel selected were two Ainu people from the far northern Japanese islands, chosen for their skills with dogs and sledges. Dogs would be the prime mode of transport in the Antarctic; Shirase's initial preference for Manchurian ponies was impractical, since the expedition's ship, acquired with the assistance of Okuna, was too small to carry horses. This ship was the Hoko Maru, a former fishing industry service boat. At 30.48 m (100 ft) in length and registering 204 GRT, she was much smaller than the other Antarctic ships of the era – less than a third the size of Robert Falcon Scott's Terra Nova. But she was strongly built, with a double layer hull sheathed with iron plating, and extra protection at the stem. She was rigged as a barquentine, and her sailing power was augmented by a small (18 horsepower) auxiliary engine. At the suggestion of Admiral Togo, she was renamed Kainan Maru, meaning "Opener-up of the South", or "Southern Pioneer". The ship was placed under the command of an experienced seafarer, Captain Naokichi Nomura.

== Expedition ==
=== To New Zealand ===
Shirase set 28 November 1910 as his departure date, and announced details of the timetable he planned to follow. The expedition would reprovision in Wellington, New Zealand, before proceeding to Antarctica, where they would set up winter quarters. Then: "On 15 September, when the winter will have ended, the party will proceed to the Pole", before returning to their base in late February 1912. Realistically, it was far too late in the season for this schedule to be viable, but this was not yet apparent to Shirase or his supporters.

On departure day, large crowds gathered to see the expedition off. In his account to The Geographical Journal, Ivar Hamre describes a gala occasion, with flags and bunting flying, while others write of brass bands, speeches and around 50,000 supporters present. The event proved anticlimactic; Kainan Maru was not ready to sail that day. When she left Tokyo 24 hours later, only a few were present to see her go – "the most dismal sort of send-off ever accorded to any polar explorer", according to Shirase. After cargo trimming in Tateyama, the ship finally left Japan on 1 December, carrying 27 men and 28 Siberian dogs, leaving behind a debt that would increase considerably during the course of the expedition, and would burden Shirase for many years. In generally poor weather, Kainan Maru struggled southwards, crossing the Equator on 29 December, and arriving in Wellington, storm-battered and unannounced, on 7 February 1911. Many of the dogs had died en route. The two contemporaneous South Pole expeditions, led respectively by Scott and Amundsen, were by this time well established in their Antarctic bases.

Initial reactions in Wellington to this unexpected late arrival were of amusement and suspicion. Many New Zealanders found it hard to accept that this was a genuine Antarctic expedition, given the lateness in the season, the inadequate-looking vessel, the unsuitable equipment and food, the apparent lack of charts. (Note: The Japanese party's sledges were described as "toy things", made of bamboo and wood. Their rations, mainly rice, plum pickles, cured beans and dried cuttlefish, bore no resemblance to the usual Antarctic high-energy fare such as pemmican.) While some suspected them as being part of a Japanese plan to expand its influence southwards, the New Zealand Times mocked the crew as "gorillas sailing about in a miserable whaler", a remark that caused Shirase deep offence.

During the few days spent in the port, the crew scoured the town for sources that might provide them with information about ice conditions further south. More particularly, they sought up-to-date charts; all they possessed for navigation beyond 60°S was a small-scale photocopy of an admiralty chart marking Ernest Shackleton's 1907 route in Nimrod. By the time they were ready to depart, they had earned some respect from the New Zealand public; the Lyttelton Times sympathetically offered "the last Godspeed to the plucky little band of explorers from the Far East". The Christchurch Press thought they were "running it fine, even with their determination and daring".

=== First Antarctic season ===
Leaving Wellington on 11 February, Kainan Maru soon ran into stormy seas, with waves among the biggest that Captain Namora had ever encountered. By 17 February, in calmer weather, the crew captured its first penguin, an item of great curiosity: "It walked upright, looking for all the world like a gentleman in an overcoat". On 26 February the first iceberg was sighted, after which the ship was surrounded by ice of all kinds, from loose brash to huge bergs. On 1 March the sky produced a brilliant aurora.

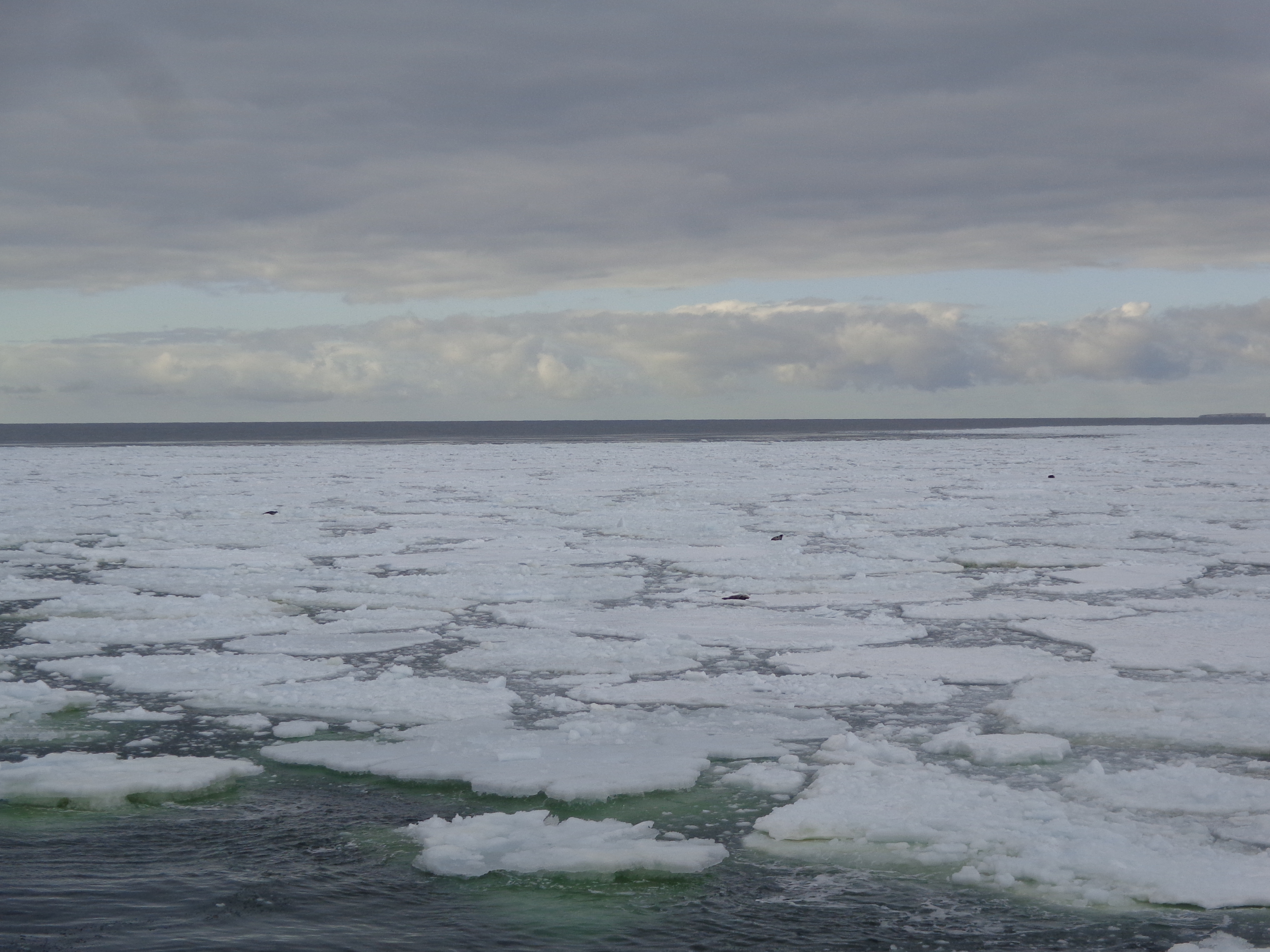
Ice in the Ross Sea (the small black objects are seals)

On 6 March the crew sighted distant land, about 65 km (40 miles) to the south-east – the peaks of the Admiralty Range in Victoria Land. As they drew nearer, expectations of a landing grew; on 8 March Kainan Maru stood off Dorset Point, but ice conditions made it impossible to get nearer to the shore. The ship sailed on, past the Possession Islands and towards Coulman Island, where ice conditions were even worse. To their further discomfort, their proximity to the South Magnetic Pole was causing violent disturbances to the compass needle.

The consequences of their late departure were now becoming evident; with the onset of winter, the sea was beginning to freeze around them. The ice "took the form of small lotus leaves, which ... gradually spread out over the sea to cover the whole surface". The small leaves turned to large disks, four metres across, through which Kainan Maru attempted to drive a passage: "The crunch and crack every time we smashed through a floe were not at all pleasant." On 12 March, when the ship's position was 74°16'S, 172°7'E, it was halted by heavy ice. They could go no further south, and were in danger of being trapped, to face a wintering in the ice that it was unlikely the ship would survive. In difficult and dangerous conditions, Nomura's skilful seamanship turned the ship northwards, and they were able to escape from the danger. Kainan Maru would now make for Sydney, Australia, to sit out the southern winter and prepare for a second season. Of 28 dogs that had left Japan, only 12 had reached New Zealand alive, and as they set out for Sydney, only one of these was left; poor conditions, combined with tapeworm infection, had proved fatal to the rest. After enduring another very rough passage, the ship reached the Australian port on 1 May.

=== Winter in Sydney ===
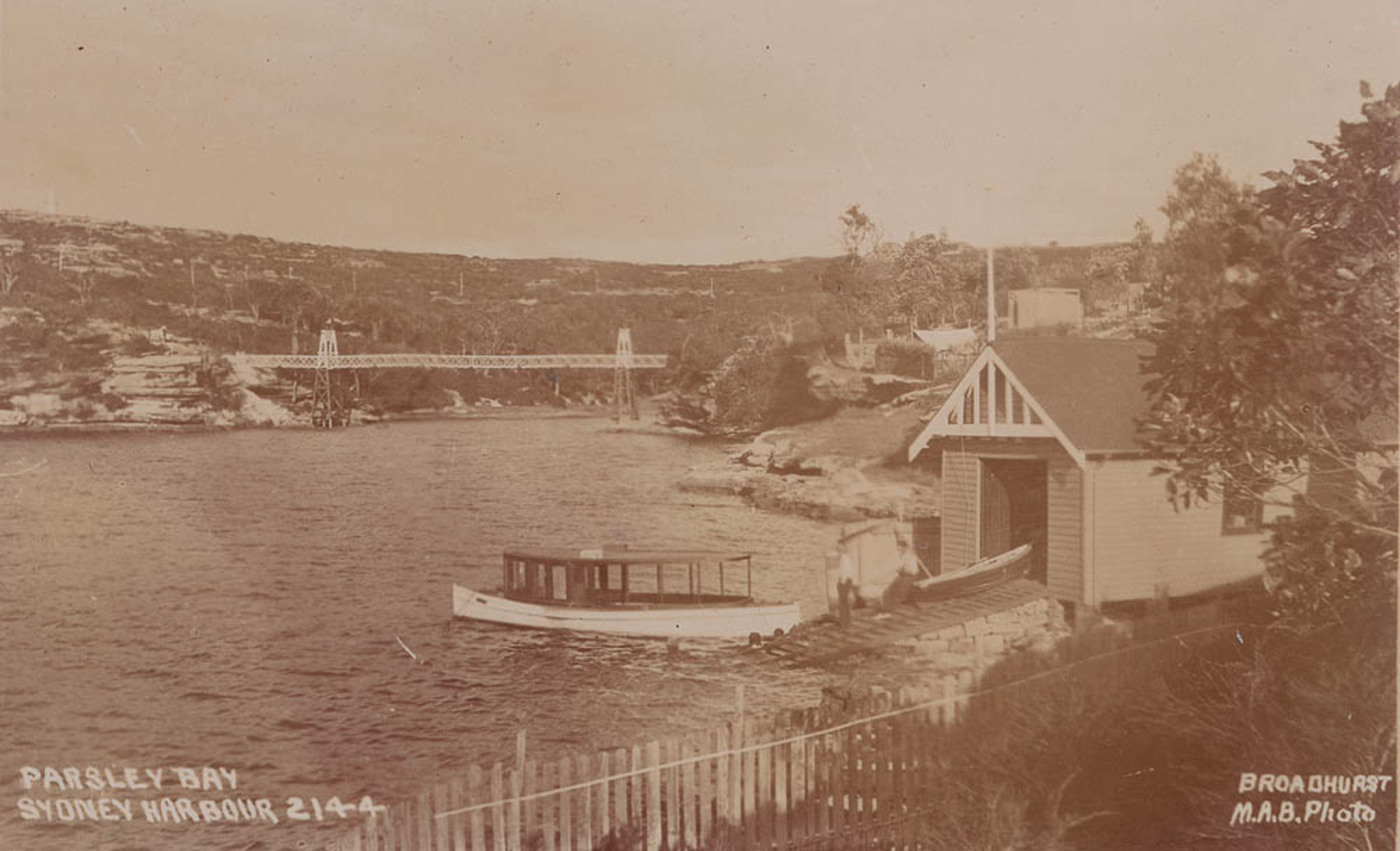
Parsley Bay, Sydney Harbour, early 20th century

The initial reception in Sydney was cool, even hostile. Tension had grown following Japan's recent military victories in Russia and China, and as in New Zealand, there was considerable suspicion about the party's true purpose. One newspaper demanded their immediate expulsion, and castigated the "supineness" of the government in failing to take immediate action. However, Shirase and his party found support from a wealthy resident in the exclusive suburb of Vaucluse, who permitted them to set up a camp in a corner of his land at Parsley Bay. Meanwhile, Kainan Maru was taken to the Jubilee Dock, to await repairs and refitting. Nomura and another expedition member, Keiichi Tada, went back to Japan to report on the situation, and to seek further funding for a renewed attempt in the following season.

The expedition found another influential supporter, in the person of Tannatt Edgeworth David, professor of geology at the University of Sydney. David had been to the Antarctic with Shackleton, and was one of the party of three who had discovered the location of the South Magnetic Pole. He accepted the Japanese expedition as genuine – only their late start, he argued, had forced them to seek shelter in Australia. David formed a close friendship with Shirase, with whom he shared his knowledge and experience of Antarctic conditions. He acted as a liaison between the expedition and local authorities and businesses, and with his advocacy the Australians' attitude to their visitors improved.

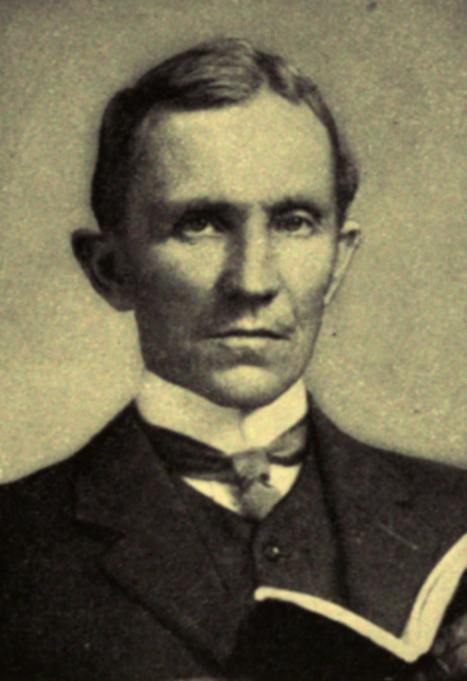
Edgeworth David

In Parsley Bay, when the early suspicions had evaporated, large numbers of visitors came to see the camp and have their photographs taken with Shirase and the other team members. A member of the expedition described the camp in idyllic terms: "surrounded by dense overgrown old trees... guava, bottlebrush, evergreen oak and pine...Standing on the rising ground behind the encampment you can gaze up at the hillside or turn to look at the sea below...like a landscape painting come alive". On 22 June, the camp was decorated with flags to mark the coronation of King George V, and visitors were entertained with exhibitions of traditional martial arts. Nevertheless, life during the long winter months was generally frugal and monotonous, "almost a beggar's life", Shirase later wrote.

After a successful plea for further funding, Nomura and Tada returned to Sydney in October with money, provisions and a fresh supply of dogs. They also brought two new expedition members, a scientist and a film cameraman, replacing original members who had withdrawn on sickness grounds. Shirase now revised his expedition's goals; Scott and Amundsen – of whom there was as yet no direct news – were, he reckoned, too far ahead of him for his aim of conquering the South Pole to be tenable. Instead, he decided, the Japanese expedition would focus on more modest objectives in science, surveying, and exploring in King Edward VII Land.

When the ship's refurbishment was complete and the expedition ready to depart, Shirase and his officers wrote to David thanking him for all the help he had given: "You were good enough to set the seal of your magnificent reputation upon our bona fides, and to treat us as brothers in the realm of science ... Whatever may be the fate of our enterprise, we will never forget you". Just before their departure, as a further sign of his regard, Shirase presented David with his 17th century samurai sword, a rare gift indeed to a non-Japanese. On 19 November 1911 Kainan Maru sailed from the harbour, where in contrast to the mood at their arrival, they were seen off by throngs of well-wishers, "cheering and waving their white handkerchiefs and black hats in the air". Edgeworth David and other supporters accompanied them for the short distance to Shark Island.

=== Second Antarctic season ===
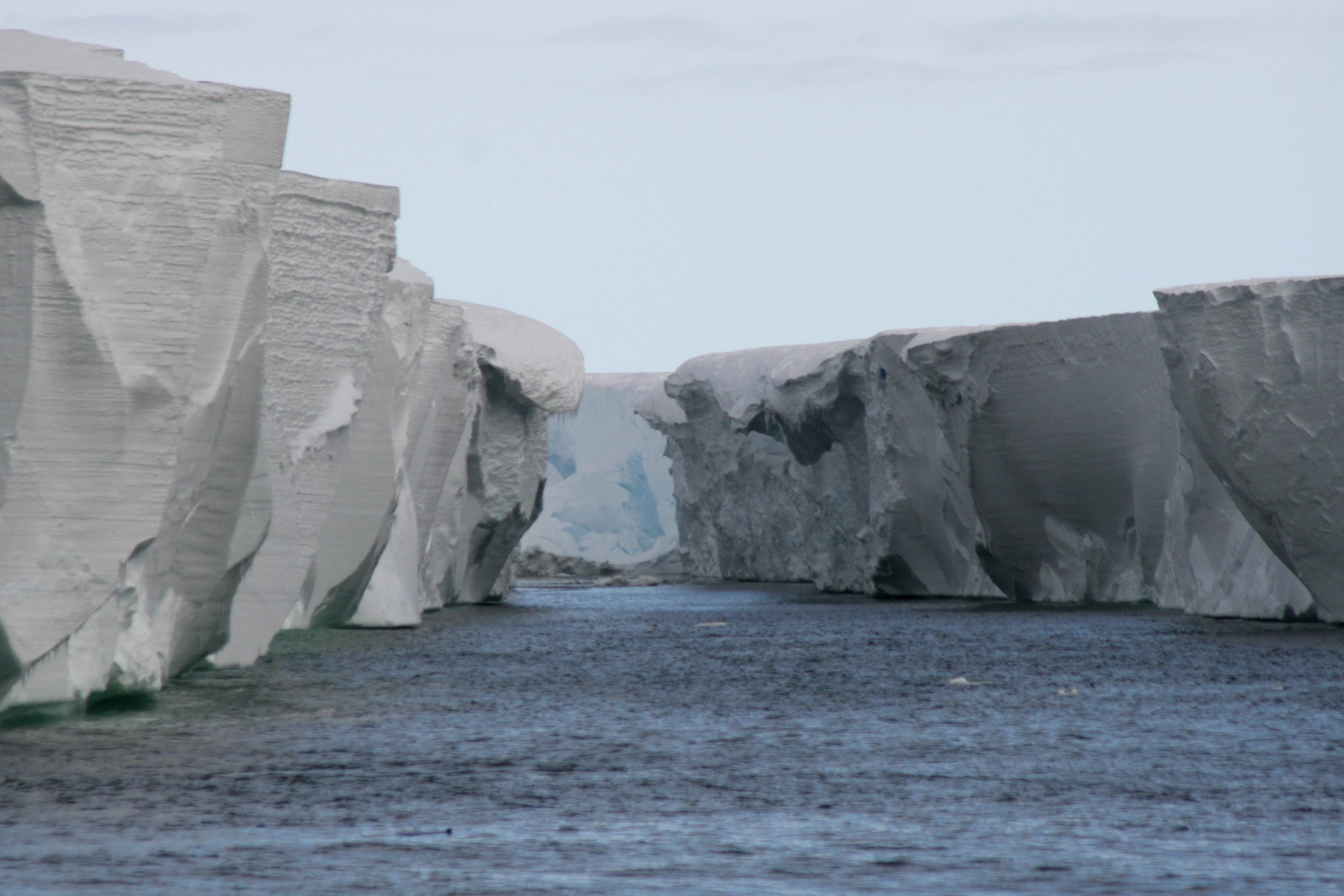
An inlet on the Great Ice Barrier edge

Kainan Maru left Sydney in fair weather, and made good progress southwards. After celebrating New Year's Day in the traditional Japanese manner, on 4 January 1912 the expedition reached Coulman Island, the turning point of the previous season. The Ross Sea was open, and Kainan Maru proceeded swiftly south, so that on 10 January they had their first sight of the Great Ice Barrier. (Note: The Great Ice Barrier, or Barrier, was discovered in 1841 by James Clark Ross. This name was used until 1953, when it was renamed the Ross Ice Shelf. In this article the name in use in 1911–1912 has been retained.) Appearing first as a faint line on the horizon, as they grew closer it took on, Shirase later wrote, the appearance of "a gigantic white snake at rest". The next day, close to the Barrier edge, they turned east to look for a likely landing place in the vicinity of King Edward VII Land. As they sailed beyond the Bay of Whales, the ship was attacked by a school of killer whales, who soon withdrew when they realised the nature of their attempted prey, but not before they had caused considerable alarm to the deeply religious Ainus, who prayed fervently throughout the attack.

On 16 January, at 78°17'S, 161°50'W, Kainan Maru came upon a small inlet in the Barrier edge, which appeared to offer a suitable landing place. An advance party ascended the Barrier to examine the surface and judge its suitability for travel. They reported that the terrain was full of crevasses, some thinly covered with ice and snow, and that surface travel for any distance would be well-nigh impossible. After naming the inlet Kainan Bay, they sailed away.

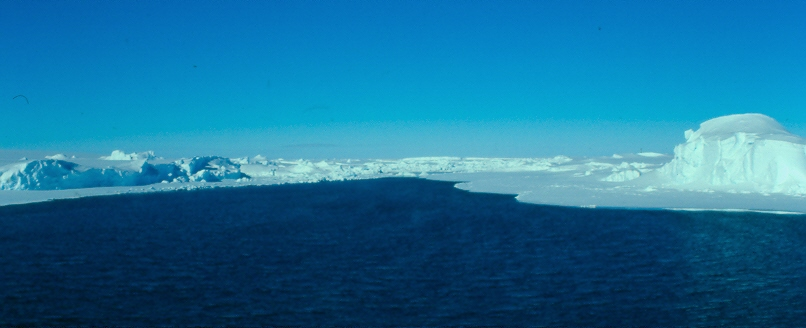
Bay of Whales

Shirase now decided to divide the expedition into two parts. One party would land at the Bay of Whales and form a "Dash Patrol" that would make a southern march across the Barrier, with the dogs. Meanwhile, Kainan Maru would take a second party to King Edward VII Land, where it would land and explore. This decided, the ship turned westward towards the Bay of Whales; as they approached, they found to their astonishment that another ship was there. After an initial speculation about pirates, they saw as they drew nearer that the ship was flying the Norwegian flag, and realised that this was Amundsen's ship, Fram. Thick sea ice had formed in the inner part of the bay, so Kainan Maru could not approach the Barrier edge, and had to moor to the ice some distance away.

On 17 January, two officers from Fram, Thorvald Nilsen and Kristian Prestrud, paid a brief visit to the Japanese ship. Communication proved difficult, although the Norwegians were received hospitably, with wine and cigars. Shirase had apparently gone to bed, and did not meet with these visitors.

==== Dash patrol ====
On 19 January, sea ice conditions having shifted, Kainan Maru was brought up close to the Barrier edge and the process of landing the shore party began. This proved difficult and dangerous, involving the cutting of an ice path through the steep cliffside to the Barrier summit to enable the transfer of men, dogs, provisions and equipment. While the landing proceeded, Nomura visited Fram and was much impressed by what he saw. The Norwegians were less flattering in their observations of the Japanese expedition, noting in particular the barbaric fashion in which wildlife was captured and killed.

"We saw a boundless plain of white ice stretching into infinity, meeting the blue sky and continuing beyond. Though we could sense the many secrets hidden in its depths, there was not a shadow to be seen. The sun was reflected off the white snow with dazzling brightness, and we were all struck to the very heart by a feeling of awe."

— Nobu Shirase [1913], Nankyokuki (2007), p. 83.

The unloading completed, Kainan Maru departed for King Edward VII Land, leaving seven men on the Barrier. Two would remain at a base camp to carry out meteorological observations, while a five-man Dash Patrol marched southward; these five men were Shirase, Takeda, Miisho and the two Ainu dog drivers. The patrol's aim was to travel as far south as possible in the limited time available, over unexplored terrain. Hence, rather than heading due south, which would have placed them in Amundsen's tracks, they chose a south-easterly route.

Clad in inadequate clothing and footwear, and with no experience of polar travel, the Dash Patrol set out at noon on 20 January. They faced severe weather, and were halted after only 13 kilometres (8.1 mi). The next day they were confined by the weather to their tents. Resuming on 22 January, over the next few days they battled on against strong winds and blizzards, while the temperature fell to −25 °C (−13 °F). Some of the dogs fell out, lame or frostbitten.

By 28 January, they calculated that they had covered 250 kilometres (160 mi), and that their position was 80° 5' S, 156° 37' W. Here, they buried a canister containing the names of the group, and raised the Japanese flag. The surrounding plain was named by Shirase as Yamato Yukihara (大和雪原, Japanese Snow Plain). After a brief ceremony and salute to the emperor, the party began its journey back to base. Weather conditions were now much more favourable, and they covered the distance in three days, possibly the fastest polar sledge journey at that time. Arriving at their base camp on 31 January, they recovered from their exertions by sleeping for 36 hours. (Note: The name "Yamato Yukihara" was officially accepted by the Japanese Antarctic Place Names Committee in 2012.)

==== King Edward VII Land ====
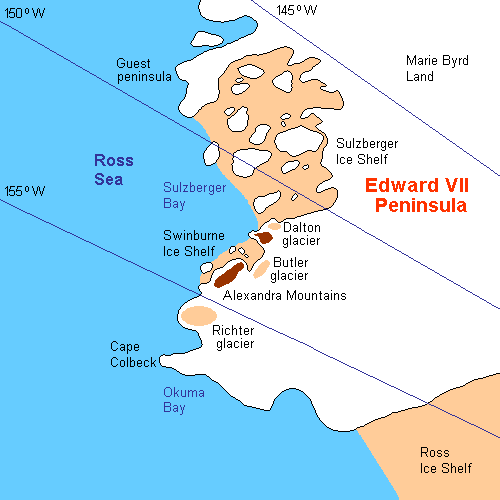
Map showing coastline of King Edward VII Land

After leaving Shirase's party, Kainan Maru sailed eastwards, arriving off the King Edward VII Land coast in Biscoe Bay on 23 January at 76°56'S, 155°55'W. (Note: The name "Biscoe Bay" for this location does not appear on modern maps. The area appears to have been subsumed into Sulzberger Bay, named by Richard E. Byrd during his Antarctic expedition of 1928–30.) Two land parties disembarked to explore what they thought was virgin territory, unaware that a team from Amundsen's expedition, led by Prestrud, had entered the land from the Barrier the previous year. The Japanese were, however, the first to make a successful landing on King Edward VII Land from the sea.

The two groups crossed the sea ice and climbed the ice wall which surrounded the coast. One party, led by Tomoji Tsuchiya, headed south but were soon stopped by impassable ice. The other party of three (Nishikawa, Watanabe and the cine-cameraman Taizumi), made better progress towards the Alexandra Mountains, which Scott had observed from the sea in 1902, and named after the British queen. The three men reached the foothills of this range but were then halted by an unbridgeable crevasse. They erected a sign recording their presence, and after some further exploration of the area and the collection of rock samples, returned to the ship.

Kainan Maru then sailed further east, in an attempt to pass the most easterly longitude, 152°W, recorded by Scott's Discovery. They reached 151°20'W, thus exceeding Scott's mark by a distance calculated as 17.3 km (11 miles). On the way back to the Bay of Whales they paused at a small bay which they named Okuma Bay in honour of the expedition's patron. On 1 February they arrived at the Bay of Whales, but ice conditions prevented them for two days from beginning the embarkation of Shirase's party. Deteriorating weather made this operation a fraught and hurried process, and resulted in much being left behind including, much to the men's distress, all the dogs. Shirase remembered these abandoned dogs in his daily prayers for the rest of his life. Kainan Maru left the bay on 4 February.

=== Return ===
Shirase had intended to make a landing at Coulman Island on the way home, but the weather was poor and this idea was abandoned. Kainan Maru arrived at Wellington on 23 March, where Shirase and a small party left the ship to take a faster steamer home, so they could prepare for the expedition's return. After taking on fresh coal and provisions, Kainan Maru left Wellington on 2 April, and arrived in Yokohama on 19 June. The next day, 20 June 1912, after a journey of nearly 50,000 km (31,000 miles), she entered Tokyo harbour to a tumultuous reception.

== Assessment and aftermath ==
=== Achievements ===
Despite the lack of experience and the unsuitability of the ship, the expedition had demonstrated conclusively that the Japanese could mount an Antarctic expedition. There were no fatalities or serious injuries among the personnel – all returned safely home. Hamre praises Nomura's seamanship as worthy of comparison with that of the great navigators.

While often treated as a footnote to the concurrent expeditions of Amundsen and Scott, the Japanese party achieved several notable distinctions. They were the first non-European team to explore in the Antarctic; they made the first landing from the sea on King Edward VII Land, where both Scott (1902) and Shackleton (1908) had failed. Kainan Maru was taken further east along the coast than any previous ship; the Dash Patrol sledged faster than anyone before, and became only the fourth team up to that time to travel beyond 80°S. The scientific data brought back by the expedition included important information on the geology of King Edward VII Land, and on ice and weather conditions in the Bay of Whales.

=== Reactions ===
On its return, the expedition was given a hero's parade through Tokyo. Shirase was received by the imperial family, and widely feted. But this fame proved short-lived; six weeks after the triumphal return, the Emperor Meiji died, and public interest in the expedition withered. Shirase found himself burdened with considerable expedition debts, with no government intervention. He had hoped to raise substantial funds from the sale of his expedition account, but found that, in the rapidly-changing Japan, the taste for the "Boys Own" type of adventure story had diminished – he had become, as Stephanie Pain puts it in her New Scientist account, "the wrong sort of hero". A documentary film, constructed from Taizumi's footage, was a commercial success, but this did not benefit Shirase, who had sold the rights to the film company.

In the wider world the expedition attracted little notice, eclipsed by the dramas surrounding Amundsen and Scott and also because the only available reports were in Japanese, a language little understood outside Japan. In Britain, the Royal Geographical Society's secretary, John Scott Keltie, was reluctant even to acknowledge the Japanese expedition, and no report of it appeared in the Society's journal for many years. The former RGS president Clements Markham ignored the expedition altogether in his polar exploration history, The Lands of Silence. The first substantial account in English, by Ivar Hamre in The Geographical Journal, did not appear until 1933.

=== Aftermath ===
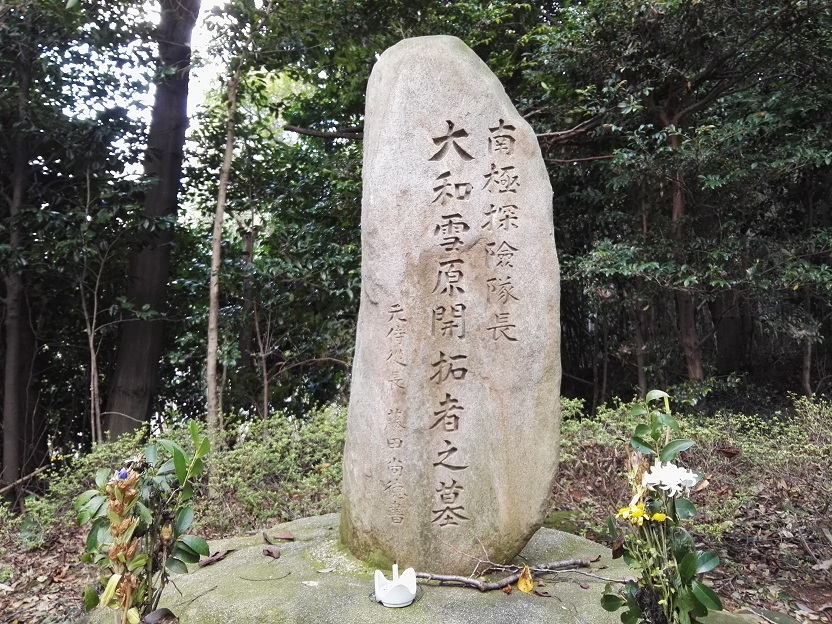
Nobu Shirase's grave

Shirase devoted most of the rest of his life to clearing the expedition's debts. He sold his house in Tokyo and moved to the Kuril Islands, where he raised money through the fox-fur business. By 1935 the last outstanding amounts had been finally paid. By then, Shirase had received belated public recognition; in 1933 he became honorary president of the newly formed Japanese Polar Research Institute. He died in relative obscurity in 1946.

Japan's interest in Antarctic research revived in 1956, with the first Japanese Antarctic Research Expedition. JARE has remained active since; its current research vessel is called Shirase. In 1981 Shirase's hometown, Nikaho, erected a statue in his memory, and in 1990 opened a museum dedicated to his expedition. In 2011, to mark the expedition's centenary, the Shirase Expedition Supporters Association published a full English translation, by Lara Dagnell and Hilary Shibata, of the original expedition report (Nankyokuki Tanken) from 1913.

Several Antarctic landmarks reference Shirase or the expedition: the Shirase Coast, the Shirase Glacier, as well as Okuma Bay and Kainan Bay. The ship itself, Kainan Maru, was sold back to its former owners, and resumed its fishery duties; its subsequent history is unknown.

In 1979 Mary Edgeworth David donated her father's samurai sword to the Australian Museum, where it is a focus of interest to many Japanese visitors. In 2002, a memorial tablet was placed in Parsley Bay, to commemorate the 90th anniversary of the Japanese expedition's sojourn there. The inscription describes the plaque as "a symbol of everlasting friendship between both countries".

== Notes and references ==
=== Sources ===
- "About JARE (Japanese Antarctic Research Expedition)". National Institute of Polar Research.
- Alberts, Fred G., ed. (1981). Geographic Names of the Antarctic. Washington DC: US National Science Foundation. OCLC 497666264.
- Amundsen, Roald; Nilsen, Thorvald; Prestrud, Kristian (1976) [1912]. The South Pole: An Account of the Norwegian expedition in the Fram, 1910–12 (Volumes I and II). Translated by Chater, A.G. London: C. Hurst & Company. ISBN 0-903983-47-8.
- "Antarctica ID 247: Alexandra Mountains". United States Geological Survey. Archived from the original on 2 August 2020.
- Arlidge, Burnham (11 February 2018). "Ross Sea Ice Shelf – The World's Largest Body of Floating Ice". Antarctica Cruise Guide.
- Barr, Susan (2013). "The Japanese Antarctic Expedition of 1912" (PDF). Nankyoku Shiryō (Antarctic Record). 57 (2). National Institute of Polar Research: 299–307. S2CID 165139563. Archived from the original (PDF) on 21 October 2019.
- Bryan, Rorke (2011). Ordeal by Ice: Ships of the Antarctic. Dobbs Ferry, NY: Sheridan House. ISBN 978-1-57409-312-4.
- Florek, Stan (22 March 2013). "Our Global Neighbours: Nobu Shirase". Australian Museum.
- Hamre, Ivar (November 1933). "The Japanese South Polar Expedition of 1911–1912". The Geographical Journal. 82 (5): 411–423. Bibcode:1933GeogJ..82..411H. doi:10.2307/1786962. JSTOR 1786962.
- "Japanese Antarctica Expedition and the Shirase Sword". Australian Museum.
- Launius, Roger D.; Fleming, James R.; DeVorkin, David H. (2010). Globalizing Polar Science. New York: Palgrave MacMillan. ISBN 978-0-230-10533-1.
- Masakane, Inoue (2012). 井上正鉄 『日本南極探検隊長 白瀬矗』 極地研ライブラリー、 (in Japanese). Tokyo: Seizandshoten. ISBN 978-4-425-57031-7. OCLC 820753055.
- "Memorial plaque to the Japanese Antarctic Expedition visit to Parsley Bay, Sydney in 1911". Australia for Visitors.
- "Nobu Shirase". South-pole.com.
- "Nobu Shirase (1861–1946)". Antarctic Logistics. 28 August 2010.
- Pain, Stephanie (24 December 2011). "Scott, Amundsen... and Nobu Shirase". New Scientist (2844).
- Shirase, Nobu (2007) [1913]. "Lt. Shirase's calling card (translated from Nankyokuki)". In Francis Spufford (ed.). The Ends of the Earth Vol II: The Antarctic. London: Granta Books. ISBN 978-1-86207-964-9.
- "Shirase". Scott Polar Research Institute.
- Strom, Marcus (25 March 2016). "A century later, Shirase returns to Sydney a hero..." Sydney Morning Herald online.
- Summerson, Rupert (2015). "Nankyoku no kyoku: The cultural life of the Shirase Antarctic Expedition 1910–12" (PDF). In Bernadette Hince; Rupert Summerson; Arnan Wiesel (eds.). Antarctica: Music, sounds and cultural connections. Canberra: ANU Press.
- Turney, Chris (2012). 1912: The Year the World Discovered Antarctica. London: The Bodley Head. ISBN 978-1-84792-174-1.
