= Okuma Bay =

Bay on the Ross Ice Shelf of Antarctica

Coordinates: 77°50′S 158°20′W

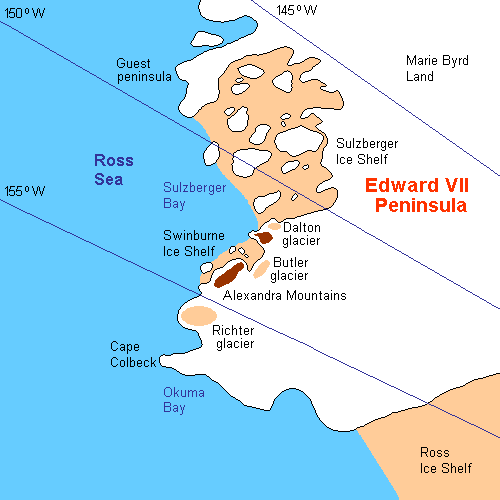
Area map of Okuma Bay

Okuma Bay is a bay located at 77°50'S 158°20'W on the Ross Ice Shelf of Antarctica at its juncture with Edward VII Peninsula.

It was discovered by the British National Antarctic Expedition (or Discovery Expedition) under Robert Falcon Scott in 1902. Named by the Japanese Antarctic Expedition led by Lt. Nobu Shirase (1911–12) after Count Shigenobu Okuma (1838–1922), the Premier of Japan.
